The Lepidoptera of Romania consist of both the butterflies and moths recorded from Romania.

Butterflies

Hesperiidae
Carcharodus floccifera (Zeller, 1847)
Carcharodus lavatherae (Esper, 1783)
Carcharodus orientalis Reverdin, 1913
Carterocephalus palaemon (Pallas, 1771)
Erynnis tages (Linnaeus, 1758)
Hesperia comma (Linnaeus, 1758)
Heteropterus morpheus (Pallas, 1771)
Muschampia cribrellum (Eversmann, 1841)
Muschampia tessellum (Hübner, 1803)
Ochlodes sylvanus (Esper, 1777)
Pyrgus alveus (Hübner, 1803)
Pyrgus armoricanus (Oberthür, 1910)
Pyrgus cacaliae (Rambur, 1839)
Pyrgus carthami (Hübner, 1813)
Pyrgus malvae (Linnaeus, 1758)
Pyrgus serratulae (Rambur, 1839)
Pyrgus sidae (Esper, 1784)
Spialia orbifer (Hübner, 1823)
Thymelicus acteon (Rottemburg, 1775)
Thymelicus lineola (Ochsenheimer, 1808)
Thymelicus sylvestris (Poda, 1761)

Lycaenidae
Aricia agestis (Denis & Schiffermüller, 1775)
Aricia anteros (Freyer, 1838)
Aricia artaxerxes (Fabricius, 1793)
Callophrys rubi (Linnaeus, 1758)
Celastrina argiolus (Linnaeus, 1758)
Cupido minimus (Fuessly, 1775)
Cupido osiris (Meigen, 1829)
Cupido alcetas (Hoffmannsegg, 1804)
Cupido argiades (Pallas, 1771)
Cupido decolorata (Staudinger, 1886)
Cyaniris semiargus (Rottemburg, 1775)
Eumedonia eumedon (Esper, 1780)
Favonius quercus (Linnaeus, 1758)
Glaucopsyche alexis (Poda, 1761)
Iolana iolas (Ochsenheimer, 1816)
Kretania sephirus (Frivaldszky, 1835)
Lampides boeticus (Linnaeus, 1767)
Leptotes pirithous (Linnaeus, 1767)
Lycaena alciphron (Rottemburg, 1775)
Lycaena dispar (Haworth, 1802)
Lycaena helle (Denis & Schiffermüller, 1775)
Lycaena hippothoe (Linnaeus, 1761)
Lycaena phlaeas (Linnaeus, 1761)
Lycaena thersamon (Esper, 1784)
Lycaena tityrus (Poda, 1761)
Lycaena virgaureae (Linnaeus, 1758)
Lysandra bellargus (Rottemburg, 1775)
Lysandra coridon (Poda, 1761)
Phengaris alcon (Denis & Schiffermüller, 1775)
Phengaris arion (Linnaeus, 1758)
Phengaris nausithous (Bergstrasser, 1779)
Phengaris teleius (Bergstrasser, 1779)
Plebejus argus (Linnaeus, 1758)
Plebejus argyrognomon (Bergstrasser, 1779)
Plebejus idas (Linnaeus, 1761)
Polyommatus admetus (Esper, 1783)
Polyommatus damon (Denis & Schiffermüller, 1775)
Polyommatus daphnis (Denis & Schiffermüller, 1775)
Polyommatus amandus (Schneider, 1792)
Polyommatus dorylas (Denis & Schiffermüller, 1775)
Polyommatus icarus (Rottemburg, 1775)
Polyommatus thersites (Cantener, 1835)
Pseudophilotes bavius (Eversmann, 1832)
Pseudophilotes vicrama (Moore, 1865)
Satyrium acaciae (Fabricius, 1787)
Satyrium ilicis (Esper, 1779)
Satyrium pruni (Linnaeus, 1758)
Satyrium spini (Denis & Schiffermüller, 1775)
Satyrium w-album (Knoch, 1782)
Scolitantides orion (Pallas, 1771)
Thecla betulae (Linnaeus, 1758)
Tomares nogelii (Herrich-Schäffer, 1851)

Nymphalidae
Aglais io (Linnaeus, 1758)
Aglais urticae (Linnaeus, 1758)
Apatura ilia (Denis & Schiffermüller, 1775)
Apatura iris (Linnaeus, 1758)
Apatura metis Freyer, 1829
Aphantopus hyperantus (Linnaeus, 1758)
Araschnia levana (Linnaeus, 1758)
Arethusana arethusa (Denis & Schiffermüller, 1775)
Argynnis paphia (Linnaeus, 1758)
Argynnis laodice (Pallas, 1771)
Argynnis pandora (Denis & Schiffermüller, 1775)
Boloria aquilonaris (Stichel, 1908)
Boloria pales (Denis & Schiffermüller, 1775)
Boloria dia (Linnaeus, 1767)
Boloria euphrosyne (Linnaeus, 1758)
Boloria selene (Denis & Schiffermüller, 1775)
Boloria titania (Esper, 1793)
Brenthis daphne (Bergstrasser, 1780)
Brenthis hecate (Denis & Schiffermüller, 1775)
Brenthis ino (Rottemburg, 1775)
Brintesia circe (Fabricius, 1775)
Chazara briseis (Linnaeus, 1764)
Coenonympha arcania (Linnaeus, 1761)
Coenonympha glycerion (Borkhausen, 1788)
Coenonympha leander (Esper, 1784)
Coenonympha pamphilus (Linnaeus, 1758)
Coenonympha tullia (Muller, 1764)
Erebia aethiops (Esper, 1777)
Erebia cassioides (Reiner & Hochenwarth, 1792)
Erebia epiphron (Knoch, 1783)
Erebia euryale (Esper, 1805)
Erebia gorge (Hübner, 1804)
Erebia ligea (Linnaeus, 1758)
Erebia manto (Denis & Schiffermüller, 1775)
Erebia medusa (Denis & Schiffermüller, 1775)
Erebia melas (Herbst, 1796)
Erebia montanus (de Prunner, 1798)
Erebia pandrose (Borkhausen, 1788)
Erebia pharte (Hübner, 1804)
Erebia pronoe (Esper, 1780)
Erebia sudetica Staudinger, 1861
Euphydryas aurinia (Rottemburg, 1775)
Euphydryas maturna (Linnaeus, 1758)
Fabriciana adippe (Denis & Schiffermüller, 1775)
Fabriciana niobe (Linnaeus, 1758)
Hipparchia fagi (Scopoli, 1763)
Hipparchia hermione (Linnaeus, 1764)
Hipparchia syriaca (Staudinger, 1871)
Hipparchia statilinus (Hufnagel, 1766)
Hipparchia semele (Linnaeus, 1758)
Hipparchia volgensis (Mazochin-Porshnjakov, 1952)
Hyponephele lupinus (O. Costa, 1836)
Hyponephele lycaon (Rottemburg, 1775)
Issoria lathonia (Linnaeus, 1758)
Kirinia climene (Esper, 1783)
Kirinia roxelana (Cramer, 1777)
Lasiommata maera (Linnaeus, 1758)
Lasiommata megera (Linnaeus, 1767)
Libythea celtis (Laicharting, 1782)
Limenitis camilla (Linnaeus, 1764)
Limenitis populi (Linnaeus, 1758)
Limenitis reducta Staudinger, 1901
Lopinga achine (Scopoli, 1763)
Maniola jurtina (Linnaeus, 1758)
Melanargia galathea (Linnaeus, 1758)
Melitaea arduinna (Esper, 1783)
Melitaea athalia (Rottemburg, 1775)
Melitaea aurelia Nickerl, 1850
Melitaea britomartis Assmann, 1847
Melitaea cinxia (Linnaeus, 1758)
Melitaea diamina (Lang, 1789)
Melitaea didyma (Esper, 1778)
Melitaea phoebe (Denis & Schiffermüller, 1775)
Melitaea trivia (Denis & Schiffermüller, 1775)
Minois dryas (Scopoli, 1763)
Neptis rivularis (Scopoli, 1763)
Neptis sappho (Pallas, 1771)
Nymphalis antiopa (Linnaeus, 1758)
Nymphalis polychloros (Linnaeus, 1758)
Nymphalis vaualbum (Denis & Schiffermüller, 1775)
Nymphalis xanthomelas (Esper, 1781)
Pararge aegeria (Linnaeus, 1758)
Polygonia c-album (Linnaeus, 1758)
Pyronia tithonus (Linnaeus, 1767)
Speyeria aglaja (Linnaeus, 1758)
Vanessa atalanta (Linnaeus, 1758)
Vanessa cardui (Linnaeus, 1758)

Papilionidae
Iphiclides podalirius (Linnaeus, 1758)
Papilio machaon Linnaeus, 1758
Parnassius apollo (Linnaeus, 1758)
Parnassius mnemosyne (Linnaeus, 1758)
Zerynthia cerisy (Godart, 1824)
Zerynthia polyxena (Denis & Schiffermüller, 1775)

Pieridae
Anthocharis cardamines (Linnaeus, 1758)
Aporia crataegi (Linnaeus, 1758)
Colias alfacariensis Ribbe, 1905
Colias chrysotheme (Esper, 1781)
Colias croceus (Fourcroy, 1785)
Colias erate (Esper, 1805)
Colias hyale (Linnaeus, 1758)
Colias myrmidone (Esper, 1781)
Euchloe ausonia (Hübner, 1804)
Gonepteryx rhamni (Linnaeus, 1758)
Leptidea morsei (Fenton, 1882)
Leptidea reali Reissinger, 1990
Leptidea sinapis (Linnaeus, 1758)
Pieris balcana Lorkovic, 1970
Pieris brassicae (Linnaeus, 1758)
Pieris bryoniae (Hübner, 1806)
Pieris ergane (Geyer, 1828)
Pieris mannii (Mayer, 1851)
Pieris napi (Linnaeus, 1758)
Pieris rapae (Linnaeus, 1758)
Pontia edusa (Fabricius, 1777)

Riodinidae
Hamearis lucina (Linnaeus, 1758)

Moths

Adelidae
Adela croesella (Scopoli, 1763)
Adela cuprella (Denis & Schiffermüller, 1775)
Adela mazzolella (Hübner, 1801)
Adela reaumurella (Linnaeus, 1758)
Adela violella (Denis & Schiffermüller, 1775)
Cauchas fibulella (Denis & Schiffermüller, 1775)
Cauchas leucocerella (Scopoli, 1763)
Cauchas rufifrontella (Treitschke, 1833)
Cauchas rufimitrella (Scopoli, 1763)
Nematopogon adansoniella (Villers, 1789)
Nematopogon metaxella (Hübner, 1813)
Nematopogon pilella (Denis & Schiffermüller, 1775)
Nematopogon robertella (Clerck, 1759)
Nematopogon schwarziellus Zeller, 1839
Nematopogon swammerdamella (Linnaeus, 1758)
Nemophora associatella (Zeller, 1839)
Nemophora congruella (Zeller, 1839)
Nemophora cupriacella (Hübner, 1819)
Nemophora degeerella (Linnaeus, 1758)
Nemophora dumerilella (Duponchel, 1839)
Nemophora fasciella (Fabricius, 1775)
Nemophora metallica (Poda, 1761)
Nemophora minimella (Denis & Schiffermüller, 1775)
Nemophora mollella (Hübner, 1813)
Nemophora ochsenheimerella (Hübner, 1813)
Nemophora pfeifferella (Hübner, 1813)
Nemophora prodigellus (Zeller, 1853)
Nemophora raddaella (Hübner, 1793)
Nemophora violellus (Herrich-Schäffer in Stainton, 1851)

Alucitidae
Alucita cancellata (Meyrick, 1908)
Alucita desmodactyla Zeller, 1847
Alucita grammodactyla Zeller, 1841
Alucita hexadactyla Linnaeus, 1758
Alucita huebneri Wallengren, 1859
Alucita major (Rebel, 1906)
Pterotopteryx dodecadactyla Hübner, 1813

Argyresthiidae
Argyresthia abdominalis Zeller, 1839
Argyresthia albistria (Haworth, 1828)
Argyresthia aurulentella Stainton, 1849
Argyresthia bonnetella (Linnaeus, 1758)
Argyresthia brockeella (Hübner, 1813)
Argyresthia conjugella Zeller, 1839
Argyresthia curvella (Linnaeus, 1761)
Argyresthia fundella (Fischer von Röslerstamm, 1835)
Argyresthia glaucinella Zeller, 1839
Argyresthia goedartella (Linnaeus, 1758)
Argyresthia ivella (Haworth, 1828)
Argyresthia pruniella (Clerck, 1759)
Argyresthia pulchella Lienig & Zeller, 1846
Argyresthia pygmaeella (Denis & Schiffermüller, 1775)
Argyresthia retinella Zeller, 1839
Argyresthia semifusca (Haworth, 1828)
Argyresthia semitestacella (Curtis, 1833)
Argyresthia sorbiella (Treitschke, 1833)
Argyresthia spinosella Stainton, 1849
Argyresthia arceuthina Zeller, 1839
Argyresthia bergiella (Ratzeburg, 1840)
Argyresthia glabratella (Zeller, 1847)
Argyresthia illuminatella Zeller, 1839
Argyresthia laevigatella Herrich-Schäffer, 1855

Autostichidae
Apatema apolausticum Gozmany, 1996
Apatema mediopallidum Walsingham, 1900
Apatema whalleyi (Popescu-Gorj & Capuse, 1965)
Aprominta designatella (Herrich-Schäffer, 1855)
Charadraula cassandra Gozmany, 1967
Deroxena venosulella (Moschler, 1862)
Holcopogon bubulcellus (Staudinger, 1859)
Oegoconia caradjai Popescu-Gorj & Capuse, 1965
Oegoconia deauratella (Herrich-Schäffer, 1854)
Pantacordis pales Gozmany, 1954

Batrachedridae
Batrachedra pinicolella (Zeller, 1839)
Batrachedra praeangusta (Haworth, 1828)

Bedelliidae
Bedellia somnulentella (Zeller, 1847)

Blastobasidae
Blastobasis phycidella (Zeller, 1839)
Hypatopa binotella (Thunberg, 1794)
Hypatopa inunctella Zeller, 1839

Brachodidae
Brachodes appendiculata (Esper, 1783)
Brachodes lucida (Lederer, 1853)
Brachodes pumila (Ochsenheimer, 1808)

Brahmaeidae
Lemonia balcanica (Herrich-Schäffer, 1847)
Lemonia dumi (Linnaeus, 1761)
Lemonia taraxaci (Denis & Schiffermüller, 1775)

Bucculatricidae
Bucculatrix absinthii Gartner, 1865
Bucculatrix albedinella (Zeller, 1839)
Bucculatrix artemisiella Herrich-Schäffer, 1855
Bucculatrix bechsteinella (Bechstein & Scharfenberg, 1805)
Bucculatrix cidarella (Zeller, 1839)
Bucculatrix cristatella (Zeller, 1839)
Bucculatrix frangutella (Goeze, 1783)
Bucculatrix gnaphaliella (Treitschke, 1833)
Bucculatrix maritima Stainton, 1851
Bucculatrix mehadiensis Rebel, 1903
Bucculatrix myricae Ragonot, 1879
Bucculatrix nigricomella (Zeller, 1839)
Bucculatrix rhamniella Herrich-Schäffer, 1855
Bucculatrix thoracella (Thunberg, 1794)
Bucculatrix ulmella Zeller, 1848
Bucculatrix ulmifoliae M. Hering, 1931

Carposinidae
Carposina berberidella Herrich-Schäffer, 1854
Carposina scirrhosella Herrich-Schäffer, 1854

Chimabachidae
Dasystoma salicella (Hübner, 1796)
Diurnea fagella (Denis & Schiffermüller, 1775)
Diurnea lipsiella (Denis & Schiffermüller, 1775)

Choreutidae
Anthophila fabriciana (Linnaeus, 1767)
Choreutis diana (Hübner, 1822)
Choreutis nemorana (Hübner, 1799)
Choreutis pariana (Clerck, 1759)
Prochoreutis holotoxa (Meyrick, 1903)
Prochoreutis myllerana (Fabricius, 1794)
Prochoreutis sehestediana (Fabricius, 1776)
Prochoreutis stellaris (Zeller, 1847)
Tebenna bjerkandrella (Thunberg, 1784)

Coleophoridae
Augasma aeratella (Zeller, 1839)
Coleophora absinthii Wocke, 1877
Coleophora adjunctella Hodgkinson, 1882
Coleophora adspersella Benander, 1939
Coleophora ahenella Heinemann, 1877
Coleophora albella (Thunberg, 1788)
Coleophora albicans Zeller, 1849
Coleophora albicostella (Duponchel, 1842)
Coleophora albidella (Denis & Schiffermüller, 1775)
Coleophora albilineella Toll, 1960
Coleophora albitarsella Zeller, 1849
Coleophora alcyonipennella (Kollar, 1832)
Coleophora alnifoliae Barasch, 1934
Coleophora alticolella Zeller, 1849
Coleophora amellivora Baldizzone, 1979
Coleophora anatipenella (Hübner, 1796)
Coleophora antennariella Herrich-Schäffer, 1861
Coleophora argentula (Stephens, 1834)
Coleophora asteris Muhlig, 1864
Coleophora astragalella Zeller, 1849
Coleophora atriplicis Meyrick, 1928
Coleophora auricella (Fabricius, 1794)
Coleophora autumnella (Duponchel, 1843)
Coleophora badiipennella (Duponchel, 1843)
Coleophora ballotella (Fischer v. Röslerstamm, 1839)
Coleophora betulella Heinemann, 1877
Coleophora bilineatella Zeller, 1849
Coleophora bilineella Herrich-Schäffer, 1855
Coleophora binderella (Kollar, 1832)
Coleophora binotapennella (Duponchel, 1843)
Coleophora brevipalpella Wocke, 1874
Coleophora caelebipennella Zeller, 1839
Coleophora caespititiella Zeller, 1839
Coleophora campestriphaga Baldizzone & Patzak, 1980
Coleophora cecidophorella Oudejans, 1972
Coleophora chalcogrammella Zeller, 1839
Coleophora chamaedriella Bruand, 1852
Coleophora ciconiella Herrich-Schäffer, 1855
Coleophora clypeiferella Hofmann, 1871
Coleophora coarctataephaga Toll, 1961
Coleophora colutella (Fabricius, 1794)
Coleophora conspicuella Zeller, 1849
Coleophora conyzae Zeller, 1868
Coleophora coracipennella (Hübner, 1796)
Coleophora cornutella Herrich-Schäffer, 1861
Coleophora coronillae Zeller, 1849
Coleophora cracella (Vallot, 1835)
Coleophora currucipennella Zeller, 1839
Coleophora deauratella Lienig & Zeller, 1846
Coleophora deviella Zeller, 1847
Coleophora dianthi Herrich-Schäffer, 1855
Coleophora dignella Toll, 1961
Coleophora directella Zeller, 1849
Coleophora ditella Zeller, 1849
Coleophora flaviella Mann, 1857
Coleophora flavipennella (Duponchel, 1843)
Coleophora follicularis (Vallot, 1802)
Coleophora fringillella Zeller, 1839
Coleophora frischella (Linnaeus, 1758)
Coleophora fuscociliella Zeller, 1849
Coleophora fuscocuprella Herrich-Schäffer, 1855
Coleophora galbulipennella Zeller, 1838
Coleophora gallipennella (Hübner, 1796)
Coleophora genistae Stainton, 1857
Coleophora glaucicolella Wood, 1892
Coleophora glitzella Hofmann, 1869
Coleophora gnaphalii Zeller, 1839
Coleophora graminicolella Heinemann, 1876
Coleophora granulatella Zeller, 1849
Coleophora gryphipennella (Hübner, 1796)
Coleophora hackmani (Toll, 1953)
Coleophora halophilella Zimmermann, 1926
Coleophora helichrysiella Krone, 1909
Coleophora hemerobiella (Scopoli, 1763)
Coleophora hungariae Gozmany, 1955
Coleophora hydrolapathella Hering, 1921
Coleophora ibipennella Zeller, 1849
Coleophora inulae Wocke, 1877
Coleophora kautzi Rebel, 1933
Coleophora klimeschiella Toll, 1952
Coleophora kroneella Fuchs, 1899
Coleophora kuehnella (Goeze, 1783)
Coleophora laricella (Hübner, 1817)
Coleophora lassella Staudinger, 1859
Coleophora limosipennella (Duponchel, 1843)
Coleophora lineolea (Haworth, 1828)
Coleophora linosyridella Fuchs, 1880
Coleophora linosyris Hering, 1937
Coleophora lithargyrinella Zeller, 1849
Coleophora lixella Zeller, 1849
Coleophora lusciniaepennella (Treitschke, 1833)
Coleophora lutipennella (Zeller, 1838)
Coleophora malatiella Toll, 1952
Coleophora mayrella (Hübner, 1813)
Coleophora medelichensis Krone, 1908
Coleophora millefolii Zeller, 1849
Coleophora milvipennis Zeller, 1839
Coleophora motacillella Zeller, 1849
Coleophora niveicostella Zeller, 1839
Coleophora nomgona Falkovitsh, 1975
Coleophora nubivagella Zeller, 1849
Coleophora nutantella Muhlig & Frey, 1857
Coleophora obscenella Herrich-Schäffer, 1855
Coleophora occatella Staudinger, 1880
Coleophora ochrea (Haworth, 1828)
Coleophora ochripennella Zeller, 1849
Coleophora ochroflava Toll, 1961
Coleophora odorariella Muhlig, 1857
Coleophora onobrychiella Zeller, 1849
Coleophora onopordiella Zeller, 1849
Coleophora oriolella Zeller, 1849
Coleophora ornatipennella (Hübner, 1796)
Coleophora otidipennella (Hübner, 1817)
Coleophora pappiferella Hofmann, 1869
Coleophora paripennella Zeller, 1839
Coleophora parthenica Meyrick, 1891
Coleophora partitella Zeller, 1849
Coleophora peisoniella Kasy, 1965
Coleophora pennella (Denis & Schiffermüller, 1775)
Coleophora peribenanderi Toll, 1943
Coleophora phlomidis Stainton, 1867
Coleophora plumbella Kanerva, 1941
Coleophora polonicella Zeller, 1865
Coleophora pratella Zeller, 1871
Coleophora preisseckeri Toll, 1942
Coleophora prunifoliae Doets, 1944
Coleophora pseudociconiella Toll, 1952
Coleophora pseudolinosyris Kasy, 1979
Coleophora pulmonariella Ragonot, 1874
Coleophora pyrrhulipennella Zeller, 1839
Coleophora rectilineella Fischer v. Röslerstamm, 1843
Coleophora remizella Baldizzone, 1983
Coleophora rudella Toll, 1944
Coleophora salicorniae Heinemann & Wocke, 1877
Coleophora saponariella Heeger, 1848
Coleophora saturatella Stainton, 1850
Coleophora scabrida Toll, 1959
Coleophora serinipennella Christoph, 1872
Coleophora serpylletorum Hering, 1889
Coleophora serratella (Linnaeus, 1761)
Coleophora serratulella Herrich-Schäffer, 1855
Coleophora silenella Herrich-Schäffer, 1855
Coleophora solitariella Zeller, 1849
Coleophora spinella (Schrank, 1802)
Coleophora squalorella Zeller, 1849
Coleophora squamella Constant, 1885
Coleophora sternipennella (Zetterstedt, 1839)
Coleophora stramentella Zeller, 1849
Coleophora striatipennella Nylander in Tengstrom, 1848
Coleophora sumptuosa Toll, 1952
Coleophora sylvaticella Wood, 1892
Coleophora taeniipennella Herrich-Schäffer, 1855
Coleophora tamesis Waters, 1929
Coleophora tanaceti Muhlig, 1865
Coleophora taygeti Baldizzone, 1983
Coleophora therinella Tengstrom, 1848
Coleophora trientella Christoph, 1872
Coleophora trifariella Zeller, 1849
Coleophora trifolii (Curtis, 1832)
Coleophora trigeminella Fuchs, 1881
Coleophora trochilella (Duponchel, 1843)
Coleophora tyrrhaenica Amsel, 1951
Coleophora unipunctella Zeller, 1849
Coleophora vacciniella Herrich-Schäffer, 1861
Coleophora valesianella Zeller, 1849
Coleophora versurella Zeller, 1849
Coleophora vestianella (Linnaeus, 1758)
Coleophora vibicella (Hübner, 1813)
Coleophora vibicigerella Zeller, 1839
Coleophora vicinella Zeller, 1849
Coleophora virgatella Zeller, 1849
Coleophora vitisella Gregson, 1856
Coleophora vulnerariae Zeller, 1839
Coleophora wockeella Zeller, 1849
Coleophora zelleriella Heinemann, 1854
Goniodoma auroguttella (Fischer v. Röslerstamm, 1841)
Goniodoma nemesi Capuse, 1970
Metriotes lutarea (Haworth, 1828)

Cosmopterigidae
Cosmopterix orichalcea Stainton, 1861
Cosmopterix schmidiella Frey, 1856
Cosmopterix scribaiella Zeller, 1850
Cosmopterix zieglerella (Hübner, 1810)
Eteobalea albiapicella (Duponchel, 1843)
Eteobalea anonymella (Riedl, 1965)
Eteobalea beata (Walsingham, 1907)
Eteobalea intermediella (Riedl, 1966)
Eteobalea isabellella (O. G. Costa, 1836)
Eteobalea serratella (Treitschke, 1833)
Eteobalea tririvella (Staudinger, 1870)
Hodgesiella rebeli (Krone, 1905)
Isidiella nickerlii (Nickerl, 1864)
Limnaecia phragmitella Stainton, 1851
Pancalia leuwenhoekella (Linnaeus, 1761)
Pancalia schwarzella (Fabricius, 1798)
Pyroderces argyrogrammos (Zeller, 1847)
Pyroderces caesaris Gozmany, 1957
Pyroderces klimeschi Rebel, 1938
Sorhagenia janiszewskae Riedl, 1962
Sorhagenia lophyrella (Douglas, 1846)
Sorhagenia rhamniella (Zeller, 1839)
Stagmatophora heydeniella (Fischer von Röslerstamm, 1838)
Vulcaniella extremella (Wocke, 1871)
Vulcaniella pomposella (Zeller, 1839)

Cossidae
Acossus terebra (Denis & Schiffermüller, 1775)
Cossus cossus (Linnaeus, 1758)
Dyspessa salicicola (Eversmann, 1848)
Dyspessa ulula (Borkhausen, 1790)
Paracossulus thrips (Hübner, 1818)
Parahypopta caestrum (Hübner, 1808)
Phragmataecia castaneae (Hübner, 1790)
Stygoides colchica (Herrich-Schäffer, 1851)
Zeuzera pyrina (Linnaeus, 1761)

Crambidae
Acentria ephemerella (Denis & Schiffermüller, 1775)
Agriphila aeneociliella (Eversmann, 1844)
Agriphila brioniellus (Zerny, 1914)
Agriphila deliella (Hübner, 1813)
Agriphila geniculea (Haworth, 1811)
Agriphila hungaricus (A. Schmidt, 1909)
Agriphila inquinatella (Denis & Schiffermüller, 1775)
Agriphila poliellus (Treitschke, 1832)
Agriphila selasella (Hübner, 1813)
Agriphila straminella (Denis & Schiffermüller, 1775)
Agriphila tolli (Błeszyński, 1952)
Agriphila tristella (Denis & Schiffermüller, 1775)
Agrotera nemoralis (Scopoli, 1763)
Anania coronata (Hufnagel, 1767)
Anania crocealis (Hübner, 1796)
Anania funebris (Strom, 1768)
Anania fuscalis (Denis & Schiffermüller, 1775)
Anania hortulata (Linnaeus, 1758)
Anania lancealis (Denis & Schiffermüller, 1775)
Anania luctualis (Hübner, 1793)
Anania perlucidalis (Hübner, 1809)
Anania stachydalis (Germar, 1821)
Anania terrealis (Treitschke, 1829)
Anania testacealis (Zeller, 1847)
Anania verbascalis (Denis & Schiffermüller, 1775)
Ancylolomia palpella (Denis & Schiffermüller, 1775)
Ancylolomia tentaculella (Hübner, 1796)
Antigastra catalaunalis (Duponchel, 1833)
Aporodes floralis (Hübner, 1809)
Atralata albofascialis (Treitschke, 1829)
Calamotropha aureliellus (Fischer v. Röslerstamm, 1841)
Calamotropha paludella (Hübner, 1824)
Cataclysta lemnata (Linnaeus, 1758)
Catoptria conchella (Denis & Schiffermüller, 1775)
Catoptria confusellus (Staudinger, 1882)
Catoptria falsella (Denis & Schiffermüller, 1775)
Catoptria fulgidella (Hübner, 1813)
Catoptria gozmanyi Błeszyński, 1956
Catoptria luctiferella (Hübner, 1813)
Catoptria lythargyrella (Hübner, 1796)
Catoptria margaritella (Denis & Schiffermüller, 1775)
Catoptria myella (Hübner, 1796)
Catoptria mytilella (Hübner, 1805)
Catoptria orientellus (Herrich-Schäffer, 1850)
Catoptria osthelderi (Lattin, 1950)
Catoptria pauperellus (Treitschke, 1832)
Catoptria permutatellus (Herrich-Schäffer, 1848)
Catoptria petrificella (Hübner, 1796)
Catoptria pinella (Linnaeus, 1758)
Catoptria radiella (Hübner, 1813)
Catoptria verellus (Zincken, 1817)
Chilo christophi Błeszyński, 1965
Chilo luteellus (Motschulsky, 1866)
Chilo phragmitella (Hübner, 1805)
Cholius luteolaris (Scopoli, 1772)
Chrysocrambus craterella (Scopoli, 1763)
Chrysocrambus linetella (Fabricius, 1781)
Chrysoteuchia culmella (Linnaeus, 1758)
Cleptotypodes ledereri (Staudinger, 1870)
Crambus alienellus Germar & Kaulfuss, 1817
Crambus ericella (Hübner, 1813)
Crambus hamella (Thunberg, 1788)
Crambus lathoniellus (Zincken, 1817)
Crambus pascuella (Linnaeus, 1758)
Crambus perlella (Scopoli, 1763)
Crambus pratella (Linnaeus, 1758)
Crambus silvella (Hübner, 1813)
Crambus uliginosellus Zeller, 1850
Cydalima perspectalis (Walker, 1859)
Cynaeda dentalis (Denis & Schiffermüller, 1775)
Cynaeda gigantea (Wocke, 1871)
Diasemia reticularis (Linnaeus, 1761)
Diasemiopsis ramburialis (Duponchel, 1834)
Dolicharthria bruguieralis (Duponchel, 1833)
Dolicharthria punctalis (Denis & Schiffermüller, 1775)
Dolicharthria stigmosalis (Herrich-Schäffer, 1848)
Donacaula forficella (Thunberg, 1794)
Donacaula mucronella (Denis & Schiffermüller, 1775)
Donacaula niloticus (Zeller, 1867)
Ecpyrrhorrhoe diffusalis (Guenee, 1854)
Ecpyrrhorrhoe rubiginalis (Hübner, 1796)
Elophila nymphaeata (Linnaeus, 1758)
Epascestria pustulalis (Hübner, 1823)
Euchromius bella (Hübner, 1796)
Euchromius bleszynskiellus Popescu-Gorj, 1964
Euchromius ocellea (Haworth, 1811)
Euchromius ramburiellus (Duponchel, 1836)
Euchromius superbellus (Zeller, 1849)
Euclasta splendidalis (Herrich-Schäffer, 1848)
Eudonia delunella (Stainton, 1849)
Eudonia lacustrata (Panzer, 1804)
Eudonia laetella (Zeller, 1846)
Eudonia mercurella (Linnaeus, 1758)
Eudonia murana (Curtis, 1827)
Eudonia pallida (Curtis, 1827)
Eudonia petrophila (Standfuss, 1848)
Eudonia phaeoleuca (Zeller, 1846)
Eudonia sudetica (Zeller, 1839)
Eudonia truncicolella (Stainton, 1849)
Eudonia vallesialis (Duponchel, 1832)
Eurrhypis guttulalis (Herrich-Schäffer, 1848)
Eurrhypis pollinalis (Denis & Schiffermüller, 1775)
Evergestis aenealis (Denis & Schiffermüller, 1775)
Evergestis caesialis (Herrich-Schäffer, 1849)
Evergestis desertalis (Hübner, 1813)
Evergestis dilutalis (Herrich-Schäffer, 1848)
Evergestis extimalis (Scopoli, 1763)
Evergestis forficalis (Linnaeus, 1758)
Evergestis frumentalis (Linnaeus, 1761)
Evergestis limbata (Linnaeus, 1767)
Evergestis pallidata (Hufnagel, 1767)
Evergestis politalis (Denis & Schiffermüller, 1775)
Evergestis sophialis (Fabricius, 1787)
Friedlanderia cicatricella (Hübner, 1824)
Gesneria centuriella (Denis & Schiffermüller, 1775)
Heliothela wulfeniana (Scopoli, 1763)
Hellula undalis (Fabricius, 1781)
Hyperlais dulcinalis (Treitschke, 1835)
Loxostege aeruginalis (Hübner, 1796)
Loxostege clathralis (Hübner, 1813)
Loxostege deliblatica Szent-Ivany & Uhrik-Meszaros, 1942
Loxostege fascialis (Hübner, 1796)
Loxostege manualis (Geyer, 1832)
Loxostege sticticalis (Linnaeus, 1761)
Loxostege turbidalis (Treitschke, 1829)
Loxostege virescalis (Guenee, 1854)
Mecyna flavalis (Denis & Schiffermüller, 1775)
Mecyna lutealis (Duponchel, 1833)
Mecyna trinalis (Denis & Schiffermüller, 1775)
Mesocrambus candiellus (Herrich-Schäffer, 1848)
Metacrambus carectellus (Zeller, 1847)
Metasia carnealis (Treitschke, 1829)
Metasia ophialis (Treitschke, 1829)
Metasia suppandalis (Hübner, 1823)
Metaxmeste phrygialis (Hübner, 1796)
Metaxmeste schrankiana (Hochenwarth, 1785)
Nascia cilialis (Hübner, 1796)
Nomophila noctuella (Denis & Schiffermüller, 1775)
Nymphula nitidulata (Hufnagel, 1767)
Orenaia alpestralis (Fabricius, 1787)
Ostrinia nubilalis (Hübner, 1796)
Ostrinia palustralis (Hübner, 1796)
Palpita vitrealis (Rossi, 1794)
Paracorsia repandalis (Denis & Schiffermüller, 1775)
Parapoynx nivalis (Denis & Schiffermüller, 1775)
Parapoynx stratiotata (Linnaeus, 1758)
Paratalanta hyalinalis (Hübner, 1796)
Paratalanta pandalis (Hübner, 1825)
Pediasia aridella (Thunberg, 1788)
Pediasia contaminella (Hübner, 1796)
Pediasia fascelinella (Hübner, 1813)
Pediasia jucundellus (Herrich-Schäffer, 1847)
Pediasia luteella (Denis & Schiffermüller, 1775)
Pediasia matricella (Treitschke, 1832)
Platytes alpinella (Hübner, 1813)
Platytes cerussella (Denis & Schiffermüller, 1775)
Pleuroptya balteata (Fabricius, 1798)
Pleuroptya ruralis (Scopoli, 1763)
Psammotis pulveralis (Hübner, 1796)
Pseudobissetia terrestrellus (Christoph, 1885)
Pyrausta aerealis (Hübner, 1793)
Pyrausta aurata (Scopoli, 1763)
Pyrausta castalis Treitschke, 1829
Pyrausta cingulata (Linnaeus, 1758)
Pyrausta coracinalis Leraut, 1982
Pyrausta despicata (Scopoli, 1763)
Pyrausta falcatalis Guenee, 1854
Pyrausta nigrata (Scopoli, 1763)
Pyrausta obfuscata (Scopoli, 1763)
Pyrausta ostrinalis (Hübner, 1796)
Pyrausta porphyralis (Denis & Schiffermüller, 1775)
Pyrausta purpuralis (Linnaeus, 1758)
Pyrausta sanguinalis (Linnaeus, 1767)
Pyrausta virginalis Duponchel, 1832
Schoenobius gigantella (Denis & Schiffermüller, 1775)
Scirpophaga praelata (Scopoli, 1763)
Sclerocona acutella (Eversmann, 1842)
Scoparia ambigualis (Treitschke, 1829)
Scoparia ancipitella (La Harpe, 1855)
Scoparia basistrigalis Knaggs, 1866
Scoparia ingratella (Zeller, 1846)
Scoparia manifestella (Herrich-Schäffer, 1848)
Scoparia pyralella (Denis & Schiffermüller, 1775)
Scoparia subfusca Haworth, 1811
Sitochroa palealis (Denis & Schiffermüller, 1775)
Sitochroa verticalis (Linnaeus, 1758)
Talis quercella (Denis & Schiffermüller, 1775)
Tegostoma comparalis (Hübner, 1796)
Thisanotia chrysonuchella (Scopoli, 1763)
Thopeutis galleriellus (Ragonot, 1892)
Titanio normalis (Hübner, 1796)
Udea accolalis (Zeller, 1867)
Udea alpinalis (Denis & Schiffermüller, 1775)
Udea austriacalis (Herrich-Schäffer, 1851)
Udea cyanalis (La Harpe, 1855)
Udea decrepitalis (Herrich-Schäffer, 1848)
Udea elutalis (Denis & Schiffermüller, 1775)
Udea ferrugalis (Hübner, 1796)
Udea fimbriatralis (Duponchel, 1834)
Udea fulvalis (Hübner, 1809)
Udea inquinatalis (Lienig & Zeller, 1846)
Udea institalis (Hübner, 1819)
Udea languidalis (Eversmann, 1842)
Udea lutealis (Hübner, 1809)
Udea nebulalis (Hübner, 1796)
Udea olivalis (Denis & Schiffermüller, 1775)
Udea prunalis (Denis & Schiffermüller, 1775)
Udea uliginosalis (Stephens, 1834)
Uresiphita gilvata (Fabricius, 1794)
Xanthocrambus lucellus (Herrich-Schäffer, 1848)
Xanthocrambus saxonellus (Zincken, 1821)

Douglasiidae
Klimeschia transversella (Zeller, 1839)
Tinagma balteolella (Fischer von Röslerstamm, 1841)
Tinagma perdicella Zeller, 1839

Drepanidae
Achlya flavicornis (Linnaeus, 1758)
Asphalia ruficollis (Denis & Schiffermüller, 1775)
Cilix asiatica O. Bang-Haas, 1907
Cilix glaucata (Scopoli, 1763)
Cymatophorina diluta (Denis & Schiffermüller, 1775)
Drepana curvatula (Borkhausen, 1790)
Drepana falcataria (Linnaeus, 1758)
Falcaria lacertinaria (Linnaeus, 1758)
Habrosyne pyritoides (Hufnagel, 1766)
Ochropacha duplaris (Linnaeus, 1761)
Polyploca ridens (Fabricius, 1787)
Sabra harpagula (Esper, 1786)
Tethea ocularis (Linnaeus, 1767)
Tethea or (Denis & Schiffermüller, 1775)
Tetheella fluctuosa (Hübner, 1803)
Thyatira batis (Linnaeus, 1758)
Watsonalla binaria (Hufnagel, 1767)
Watsonalla cultraria (Fabricius, 1775)

Elachistidae
Agonopterix adspersella (Kollar, 1832)
Agonopterix alstromeriana (Clerck, 1759)
Agonopterix angelicella (Hübner, 1813)
Agonopterix arenella (Denis & Schiffermüller, 1775)
Agonopterix aspersella (Constant, 1888)
Agonopterix assimilella (Treitschke, 1832)
Agonopterix astrantiae (Heinemann, 1870)
Agonopterix atomella (Denis & Schiffermüller, 1775)
Agonopterix banatica Georgesco, 1965
Agonopterix capreolella (Zeller, 1839)
Agonopterix carduella (Hübner, 1817)
Agonopterix ciliella (Stainton, 1849)
Agonopterix cnicella (Treitschke, 1832)
Agonopterix comitella (Lederer, 1855)
Agonopterix conterminella (Zeller, 1839)
Agonopterix curvipunctosa (Haworth, 1811)
Agonopterix doronicella (Wocke, 1849)
Agonopterix dumitrescui Georgesco, 1965
Agonopterix furvella (Treitschke, 1832)
Agonopterix heracliana (Linnaeus, 1758)
Agonopterix hypericella (Hübner, 1817)
Agonopterix kaekeritziana (Linnaeus, 1767)
Agonopterix laterella (Denis & Schiffermüller, 1775)
Agonopterix liturosa (Haworth, 1811)
Agonopterix melancholica (Rebel, 1917)
Agonopterix nanatella (Stainton, 1849)
Agonopterix nervosa (Haworth, 1811)
Agonopterix nodiflorella (Milliere, 1866)
Agonopterix ocellana (Fabricius, 1775)
Agonopterix pallorella (Zeller, 1839)
Agonopterix parilella (Treitschke, 1835)
Agonopterix petasitis (Standfuss, 1851)
Agonopterix propinquella (Treitschke, 1835)
Agonopterix purpurea (Haworth, 1811)
Agonopterix putridella (Denis & Schiffermüller, 1775)
Agonopterix rotundella (Douglas, 1846)
Agonopterix scopariella (Heinemann, 1870)
Agonopterix selini (Heinemann, 1870)
Agonopterix senecionis (Nickerl, 1864)
Agonopterix yeatiana (Fabricius, 1781)
Anchinia cristalis (Scopoli, 1763)
Anchinia daphnella (Denis & Schiffermüller, 1775)
Blastodacna hellerella (Duponchel, 1838)
Chrysoclista linneella (Clerck, 1759)
Chrysoclista splendida Karsholt, 1997
Depressaria absynthiella Herrich-Schäffer, 1865
Depressaria albipunctella (Denis & Schiffermüller, 1775)
Depressaria badiella (Hübner, 1796)
Depressaria bupleurella Heinemann, 1870
Depressaria chaerophylli Zeller, 1839
Depressaria corticinella Zeller, 1854
Depressaria depressana (Fabricius, 1775)
Depressaria discipunctella Herrich-Schäffer, 1854
Depressaria douglasella Stainton, 1849
Depressaria heydenii Zeller, 1854
Depressaria hofmanni Stainton, 1861
Depressaria libanotidella Schlager, 1849
Depressaria marcella Rebel, 1901
Depressaria olerella Zeller, 1854
Depressaria pimpinellae Zeller, 1839
Depressaria pulcherrimella Stainton, 1849
Depressaria radiella (Goeze, 1783)
Depressaria sordidatella Tengstrom, 1848
Depressaria tenebricosa Zeller, 1854
Depressaria ultimella Stainton, 1849
Depressaria ululana Rossler, 1866
Depressaria veneficella Zeller, 1847
Depressaria zelleri Staudinger, 1879
Depressaria dictamnella (Treitschke, 1835)
Dystebenna stephensi (Stainton, 1849)
Elachista adscitella Stainton, 1851
Elachista argentella (Clerck, 1759)
Elachista bedellella (Sircom, 1848)
Elachista bisulcella (Duponchel, 1843)
Elachista chrysodesmella Zeller, 1850
Elachista cingillella (Herrich-Schäffer, 1855)
Elachista collitella (Duponchel, 1843)
Elachista dispilella Zeller, 1839
Elachista dispunctella (Duponchel, 1843)
Elachista gangabella Zeller, 1850
Elachista hedemanni Rebel, 1899
Elachista heringi Rebel, 1899
Elachista nitidulella (Herrich-Schäffer, 1885)
Elachista obliquella Stainton, 1854
Elachista pollinariella Zeller, 1839
Elachista pollutella Duponchel, 1843
Elachista pullicomella Zeller, 1839
Elachista rudectella Stainton, 1851
Elachista squamosella (Duponchel, 1843)
Elachista subalbidella Schlager, 1847
Elachista subocellea (Stephens, 1834)
Elachista triatomea (Haworth, 1828)
Elachista albifrontella (Hübner, 1817)
Elachista anserinella Zeller, 1839
Elachista apicipunctella Stainton, 1849
Elachista atricomella Stainton, 1849
Elachista biatomella (Stainton, 1848)
Elachista bifasciella Treitschke, 1833
Elachista canapennella (Hübner, 1813)
Elachista consortella Stainton, 1851
Elachista dimicatella Rebel, 1903
Elachista eleochariella Stainton, 1851
Elachista exactella (Herrich-Schäffer, 1855)
Elachista freyerella (Hübner, 1825)
Elachista griseella (Duponchel, 1843)
Elachista herrichii Frey, 1859
Elachista humilis Zeller, 1850
Elachista luticomella Zeller, 1839
Elachista maculicerusella (Bruand, 1859)
Elachista martinii O. Hofmann, 1898
Elachista nobilella Zeller, 1839
Elachista ornithopodella Frey, 1859
Elachista poae Stainton, 1855
Elachista pomerana Frey, 1870
Elachista quadripunctella (Hübner, 1825)
Elachista regificella Sircom, 1849
Elachista rufocinerea (Haworth, 1828)
Elachista scirpi Stainton, 1887
Elachista stabilella Stainton, 1858
Elachista subnigrella Douglas, 1853
Elachista utonella Frey, 1856
Ethmia aurifluella (Hübner, 1810)
Ethmia bipunctella (Fabricius, 1775)
Ethmia candidella (Alphéraky, 1908)
Ethmia chrysopyga (Zeller, 1844)
Ethmia dodecea (Haworth, 1828)
Ethmia fumidella (Wocke, 1850)
Ethmia haemorrhoidella (Eversmann, 1844)
Ethmia iranella Zerny, 1940
Ethmia lugubris (Staudinger, 1879)
Ethmia pusiella (Linnaeus, 1758)
Ethmia quadrillella (Goeze, 1783)
Ethmia rothschildi (Rebel, 1912)
Ethmia terminella T. B. Fletcher, 1938
Exaeretia ledereri (Zeller, 1854)
Exaeretia lutosella (Herrich-Schäffer, 1854)
Exaeretia preisseckeri (Rebel, 1937)
Exaeretia allisella Stainton, 1849
Fuchsia luteella (Heinemann, 1870)
Haplochrois ochraceella (Rebel, 1903)
Heinemannia festivella (Denis & Schiffermüller, 1775)
Heinemannia laspeyrella (Hübner, 1796)
Hypercallia citrinalis (Scopoli, 1763)
Levipalpus hepatariella (Lienig & Zeller, 1846)
Luquetia lobella (Denis & Schiffermüller, 1775)
Orophia denisella (Denis & Schiffermüller, 1775)
Orophia ferrugella (Denis & Schiffermüller, 1775)
Orophia sordidella (Hübner, 1796)
Perittia herrichiella (Herrich-Schäffer, 1855)
Semioscopis avellanella (Hübner, 1793)
Semioscopis oculella (Thunberg, 1794)
Semioscopis steinkellneriana (Denis & Schiffermüller, 1775)
Semioscopis strigulana (Denis & Schiffermüller, 1775)
Spuleria flavicaput (Haworth, 1828)
Stephensia abbreviatella (Stainton, 1851)
Stephensia brunnichella (Linnaeus, 1767)
Telechrysis tripuncta (Haworth, 1828)

Endromidae
Endromis versicolora (Linnaeus, 1758)

Epermeniidae
Epermenia aequidentellus (E. Hofmann, 1867)
Epermenia chaerophyllella (Goeze, 1783)
Epermenia illigerella (Hübner, 1813)
Epermenia insecurella (Stainton, 1854)
Epermenia petrusellus (Heylaerts, 1883)
Epermenia strictellus (Wocke, 1867)
Epermenia profugella (Stainton, 1856)
Epermenia pontificella (Hübner, 1796)
Epermenia scurella (Stainton, 1851)
Ochromolopis ictella (Hübner, 1813)
Phaulernis dentella (Zeller, 1839)
Phaulernis fulviguttella (Zeller, 1839)

Erebidae
Amata kruegeri (Ragusa, 1904)
Amata phegea (Linnaeus, 1758)
Arctia caja (Linnaeus, 1758)
Arctia festiva (Hufnagel, 1766)
Arctia villica (Linnaeus, 1758)
Arctornis l-nigrum (Muller, 1764)
Arytrura musculus (Menetries, 1859)
Atolmis rubricollis (Linnaeus, 1758)
Autophila dilucida (Hübner, 1808)
Callimorpha dominula (Linnaeus, 1758)
Calliteara abietis (Denis & Schiffermüller, 1775)
Calliteara pudibunda (Linnaeus, 1758)
Calymma communimacula (Denis & Schiffermüller, 1775)
Calyptra thalictri (Borkhausen, 1790)
Catephia alchymista (Denis & Schiffermüller, 1775)
Catocala conversa (Esper, 1783)
Catocala dilecta (Hübner, 1808)
Catocala disjuncta (Geyer, 1828)
Catocala diversa (Geyer, 1828)
Catocala electa (Vieweg, 1790)
Catocala elocata (Esper, 1787)
Catocala fraxini (Linnaeus, 1758)
Catocala fulminea (Scopoli, 1763)
Catocala hymenaea (Denis & Schiffermüller, 1775)
Catocala nupta (Linnaeus, 1767)
Catocala nymphagoga (Esper, 1787)
Catocala promissa (Denis & Schiffermüller, 1775)
Catocala puerpera (Giorna, 1791)
Catocala sponsa (Linnaeus, 1767)
Chelis maculosa (Gerning, 1780)
Clytie syriaca (Bugnion, 1837)
Colobochyla salicalis (Denis & Schiffermüller, 1775)
Coscinia cribraria (Linnaeus, 1758)
Coscinia striata (Linnaeus, 1758)
Cybosia mesomella (Linnaeus, 1758)
Diacrisia sannio (Linnaeus, 1758)
Diaphora luctuosa (Hübner, 1831)
Diaphora mendica (Clerck, 1759)
Dicallomera fascelina (Linnaeus, 1758)
Drasteria cailino (Lefebvre, 1827)
Drasteria caucasica (Kolenati, 1846)
Dysauxes ancilla (Linnaeus, 1767)
Dysauxes famula (Freyer, 1836)
Dysauxes punctata (Fabricius, 1781)
Dysgonia algira (Linnaeus, 1767)
Eilema caniola (Hübner, 1808)
Eilema complana (Linnaeus, 1758)
Eilema depressa (Esper, 1787)
Eilema griseola (Hübner, 1803)
Eilema lurideola (Zincken, 1817)
Eilema lutarella (Linnaeus, 1758)
Eilema palliatella (Scopoli, 1763)
Eilema pseudocomplana (Daniel, 1939)
Eilema pygmaeola (Doubleday, 1847)
Eilema sororcula (Hufnagel, 1766)
Eublemma amoena (Hübner, 1803)
Eublemma minutata (Fabricius, 1794)
Eublemma ostrina (Hübner, 1808)
Eublemma panonica (Freyer, 1840)
Eublemma parva (Hübner, 1808)
Eublemma polygramma (Duponchel, 1842)
Eublemma pudorina (Staudinger, 1889)
Eublemma purpurina (Denis & Schiffermüller, 1775)
Eublemma rosea (Hübner, 1790)
Euclidia mi (Clerck, 1759)
Euclidia glyphica (Linnaeus, 1758)
Euclidia triquetra (Denis & Schiffermüller, 1775)
Euplagia quadripunctaria (Poda, 1761)
Euproctis chrysorrhoea (Linnaeus, 1758)
Euproctis similis (Fuessly, 1775)
Exophyla rectangularis (Geyer, 1828)
Grammia quenseli (Paykull, 1791)
Grammodes stolida (Fabricius, 1775)
Gynaephora selenitica (Esper, 1789)
Herminia grisealis (Denis & Schiffermüller, 1775)
Herminia tarsicrinalis (Knoch, 1782)
Herminia tarsipennalis (Treitschke, 1835)
Herminia tenuialis (Rebel, 1899)
Hypena crassalis (Fabricius, 1787)
Hypena obesalis Treitschke, 1829
Hypena proboscidalis (Linnaeus, 1758)
Hypena rostralis (Linnaeus, 1758)
Hypenodes humidalis Doubleday, 1850
Hypenodes pannonica Fibiger, Pekarsky & Ronkay, 2010
Hyphantria cunea (Drury, 1773)
Hyphoraia aulica (Linnaeus, 1758)
Idia calvaria (Denis & Schiffermüller, 1775)
Laelia coenosa (Hübner, 1808)
Laspeyria flexula (Denis & Schiffermüller, 1775)
Leucoma salicis (Linnaeus, 1758)
Lithosia quadra (Linnaeus, 1758)
Lygephila craccae (Denis & Schiffermüller, 1775)
Lygephila lusoria (Linnaeus, 1758)
Lygephila pastinum (Treitschke, 1826)
Lygephila viciae (Hübner, 1822)
Lymantria dispar (Linnaeus, 1758)
Lymantria monacha (Linnaeus, 1758)
Macrochilo cribrumalis (Hübner, 1793)
Metachrostis dardouini (Boisduval, 1840)
Miltochrista miniata (Forster, 1771)
Minucia lunaris (Denis & Schiffermüller, 1775)
Nudaria mundana (Linnaeus, 1761)
Ocneria rubea (Denis & Schiffermüller, 1775)
Ocnogyna parasita (Hübner, 1790)
Odice arcuinna (Hübner, 1790)
Odice suava (Hübner, 1813)
Ophiusa tirhaca (Cramer, 1773)
Orectis proboscidata (Herrich-Schäffer, 1851)
Orgyia antiquoides (Hübner, 1822)
Orgyia recens (Hübner, 1819)
Orgyia antiqua (Linnaeus, 1758)
Paracolax tristalis (Fabricius, 1794)
Parascotia fuliginaria (Linnaeus, 1761)
Parasemia plantaginis (Linnaeus, 1758)
Parocneria detrita (Esper, 1785)
Parocneria terebinthi (Freyer, 1838)
Pechipogo plumigeralis Hübner, 1825
Pechipogo simplicicornis (Zerny, 1935)
Pechipogo strigilata (Linnaeus, 1758)
Pelosia muscerda (Hufnagel, 1766)
Pelosia obtusa (Herrich-Schäffer, 1852)
Penthophera morio (Linnaeus, 1767)
Pericallia matronula (Linnaeus, 1758)
Phragmatobia fuliginosa (Linnaeus, 1758)
Phragmatobia luctifera (Denis & Schiffermüller, 1775)
Phytometra viridaria (Clerck, 1759)
Polypogon gryphalis (Herrich-Schäffer, 1851)
Polypogon tentacularia (Linnaeus, 1758)
Rhyparia purpurata (Linnaeus, 1758)
Rhyparioides metelkana (Lederer, 1861)
Rivula sericealis (Scopoli, 1763)
Schrankia costaestrigalis (Stephens, 1834)
Schrankia taenialis (Hübner, 1809)
Scoliopteryx libatrix (Linnaeus, 1758)
Setina aurita (Esper, 1787)
Setina irrorella (Linnaeus, 1758)
Setina roscida (Denis & Schiffermüller, 1775)
Simplicia rectalis (Eversmann, 1842)
Spilosoma lubricipeda (Linnaeus, 1758)
Spilosoma lutea (Hufnagel, 1766)
Spilosoma urticae (Esper, 1789)
Thumatha senex (Hübner, 1808)
Trisateles emortualis (Denis & Schiffermüller, 1775)
Tyria jacobaeae (Linnaeus, 1758)
Utetheisa pulchella (Linnaeus, 1758)
Watsonarctia deserta (Bartel, 1902)
Zanclognatha lunalis (Scopoli, 1763)
Zanclognatha zelleralis (Wocke, 1850)
Zekelita antiqualis (Hübner, 1809)

Eriocottidae
Deuterotinea casanella (Eversmann, 1844)
Dyseriocrania subpurpurella (Haworth, 1828)
Eriocrania cicatricella (Zetterstedt, 1839)
Eriocrania sangii (Wood, 1891)
Eriocrania semipurpurella (Stephens, 1835)
Eriocrania sparrmannella (Bosc, 1791)
Heringocrania unimaculella (Zetterstedt, 1839)
Paracrania chrysolepidella (Zeller, 1851)

Euteliidae
Eutelia adulatrix (Hübner, 1813)

Gelechiidae
Acompsia cinerella (Clerck, 1759)
Acompsia tripunctella (Denis & Schiffermüller, 1775)
Agonochaetia terrestrella (Zeller, 1872)
Altenia scriptella (Hübner, 1796)
Anacampsis blattariella (Hübner, 1796)
Anacampsis obscurella (Denis & Schiffermüller, 1775)
Anacampsis populella (Clerck, 1759)
Anacampsis scintillella (Fischer von Röslerstamm, 1841)
Anacampsis timidella (Wocke, 1887)
Anarsia eleagnella Kuznetsov, 1957
Anarsia lineatella Zeller, 1839
Anarsia spartiella (Schrank, 1802)
Anasphaltis renigerellus (Zeller, 1839)
Apodia bifractella (Duponchel, 1843)
Aproaerema anthyllidella (Hübner, 1813)
Argolamprotes micella (Denis & Schiffermüller, 1775)
Aristotelia brizella (Treitschke, 1833)
Aristotelia subdecurtella (Stainton, 1859)
Aristotelia subericinella (Duponchel, 1843)
Aroga aristotelis (Milliere, 1876)
Aroga flavicomella (Zeller, 1839)
Aroga velocella (Duponchel, 1838)
Athrips mouffetella (Linnaeus, 1758)
Athrips nigricostella (Duponchel, 1842)
Athrips patockai (Povolny, 1979)
Athrips pruinosella (Lienig & Zeller, 1846)
Athrips rancidella (Herrich-Schäffer, 1854)
Atremaea lonchoptera Staudinger, 1871
Brachmia blandella (Fabricius, 1798)
Brachmia dimidiella (Denis & Schiffermüller, 1775)
Brachmia inornatella (Douglas, 1850)
Brachmia procursella Rebel, 1903
Bryotropha affinis (Haworth, 1828)
Bryotropha azovica Bidzilia, 1997
Bryotropha desertella (Douglas, 1850)
Bryotropha domestica (Haworth, 1828)
Bryotropha galbanella (Zeller, 1839)
Bryotropha senectella (Zeller, 1839)
Bryotropha similis (Stainton, 1854)
Bryotropha tachyptilella (Rebel, 1916)
Bryotropha terrella (Denis & Schiffermüller, 1775)
Carpatolechia aenigma (Sattler, 1983)
Carpatolechia alburnella (Zeller, 1839)
Carpatolechia decorella (Haworth, 1812)
Carpatolechia fugacella (Zeller, 1839)
Carpatolechia fugitivella (Zeller, 1839)
Carpatolechia notatella (Hübner, 1813)
Carpatolechia proximella (Hübner, 1796)
Caryocolum alsinella (Zeller, 1868)
Caryocolum cassella (Walker, 1864)
Caryocolum fischerella (Treitschke, 1833)
Caryocolum huebneri (Haworth, 1828)
Caryocolum inflativorella (Klimesch, 1938)
Caryocolum junctella (Douglas, 1851)
Caryocolum klosi (Rebel, 1917)
Caryocolum kroesmanniella (Herrich-Schäffer, 1854)
Caryocolum leucomelanella (Zeller, 1839)
Caryocolum proxima (Haworth, 1828)
Caryocolum schleichi (Christoph, 1872)
Caryocolum tischeriella (Zeller, 1839)
Caryocolum tricolorella (Haworth, 1812)
Caryocolum vicinella (Douglas, 1851)
Caulastrocecis furfurella (Staudinger, 1871)
Caulastrocecis pudicellus (Mann, 1861)
Chionodes continuella (Zeller, 1839)
Chionodes distinctella (Zeller, 1839)
Chionodes electella (Zeller, 1839)
Chionodes fumatella (Douglas, 1850)
Chionodes hayreddini Kocak, 1986
Chionodes luctuella (Hübner, 1793)
Chrysoesthia drurella (Fabricius, 1775)
Chrysoesthia sexguttella (Thunberg, 1794)
Cosmardia moritzella (Treitschke, 1835)
Crossobela trinotella (Herrich-Schäffer, 1856)
Dichomeris alacella (Zeller, 1839)
Dichomeris barbella (Denis & Schiffermüller, 1775)
Dichomeris derasella (Denis & Schiffermüller, 1775)
Dichomeris juniperella (Linnaeus, 1761)
Dichomeris latipennella (Rebel, 1937)
Dichomeris limosellus (Schlager, 1849)
Dichomeris marginella (Fabricius, 1781)
Dichomeris rasilella (Herrich-Schäffer, 1854)
Dichomeris ustalella (Fabricius, 1794)
Ephysteris diminutella (Zeller, 1847)
Ephysteris insulella (Heinemann, 1870)
Ephysteris promptella (Staudinger, 1859)
Eulamprotes atrella (Denis & Schiffermüller, 1775)
Eulamprotes ochricapilla (Rebel, 1903)
Eulamprotes plumbella (Heinemann, 1870)
Eulamprotes superbella (Zeller, 1839)
Eulamprotes unicolorella (Duponchel, 1843)
Eulamprotes wilkella (Linnaeus, 1758)
Exoteleia dodecella (Linnaeus, 1758)
Filatima djakovica Anikin & Piskunov, 1996
Filatima spurcella (Duponchel, 1843)
Filatima tephritidella (Duponchel, 1844)
Filatima transsilvanella Z. Kovacs & S. Kovacs, 2002
Gelechia asinella (Hübner, 1796)
Gelechia basipunctella Herrich-Schäffer, 1854
Gelechia cuneatella Douglas, 1852
Gelechia hippophaella (Schrank, 1802)
Gelechia muscosella Zeller, 1839
Gelechia nigra (Haworth, 1828)
Gelechia rhombella (Denis & Schiffermüller, 1775)
Gelechia rhombelliformis Staudinger, 1871
Gelechia sabinellus (Zeller, 1839)
Gelechia scotinella Herrich-Schäffer, 1854
Gelechia sestertiella Herrich-Schäffer, 1854
Gelechia sororculella (Hübner, 1817)
Gelechia turpella (Denis & Schiffermüller, 1775)
Gnorimoschema herbichii (Nowicki, 1864)
Helcystogramma albinervis (Gerasimov, 1929)
Helcystogramma arulensis (Rebel, 1929)
Helcystogramma lineolella (Zeller, 1839)
Helcystogramma lutatella (Herrich-Schäffer, 1854)
Helcystogramma rufescens (Haworth, 1828)
Helcystogramma triannulella (Herrich-Schäffer, 1854)
Holcophora statices Staudinger, 1871
Hypatima rhomboidella (Linnaeus, 1758)
Isophrictis anthemidella (Wocke, 1871)
Isophrictis striatella (Denis & Schiffermüller, 1775)
Iwaruna biguttella (Duponchel, 1843)
Iwaruna klimeschi Wolff, 1958
Klimeschiopsis kiningerella (Duponchel, 1843)
Megacraspedus binotella (Duponchel, 1843)
Megacraspedus dolosellus (Zeller, 1839)
Megacraspedus imparellus (Fischer von Röslerstamm, 1843)
Megacraspedus separatellus (Fischer von Röslerstamm, 1843)
Mesophleps silacella (Hübner, 1796)
Metanarsia modesta Staudinger, 1871
Metzneria aestivella (Zeller, 1839)
Metzneria aprilella (Herrich-Schäffer, 1854)
Metzneria artificella (Herrich-Schäffer, 1861)
Metzneria ehikeella Gozmany, 1954
Metzneria intestinella (Mann, 1864)
Metzneria lappella (Linnaeus, 1758)
Metzneria metzneriella (Stainton, 1851)
Metzneria neuropterella (Zeller, 1839)
Metzneria paucipunctella (Zeller, 1839)
Mirificarma cytisella (Treitschke, 1833)
Mirificarma eburnella (Denis & Schiffermüller, 1775)
Mirificarma interrupta (Curtis, 1827)
Mirificarma lentiginosella (Zeller, 1839)
Mirificarma maculatella (Hübner, 1796)
Mirificarma rhodoptera (Mann, 1866)
Monochroa cytisella (Curtis, 1837)
Monochroa elongella (Heinemann, 1870)
Monochroa hornigi (Staudinger, 1883)
Monochroa inflexella Svensson, 1992
Monochroa lucidella (Stephens, 1834)
Monochroa lutulentella (Zeller, 1839)
Monochroa nomadella (Zeller, 1868)
Monochroa palustrellus (Douglas, 1850)
Monochroa rumicetella (O. Hofmann, 1868)
Monochroa sepicolella (Herrich-Schäffer, 1854)
Monochroa servella (Zeller, 1839)
Monochroa suffusella (Douglas, 1850)
Monochroa tenebrella (Hübner, 1817)
Neofaculta ericetella (Geyer, 1832)
Neofaculta infernella (Herrich-Schäffer, 1854)
Neofriseria peliella (Treitschke, 1835)
Neotelphusa sequax (Haworth, 1828)
Nothris lemniscellus (Zeller, 1839)
Nothris verbascella (Denis & Schiffermüller, 1775)
Ornativalva ornatella Sattler, 1967
Ornativalva plutelliformis (Staudinger, 1859)
Parachronistis albiceps (Zeller, 1839)
Parastenolechia nigrinotella (Zeller, 1847)
Pexicopia malvella (Hübner, 1805)
Phthorimaea operculella (Zeller, 1873)
Platyedra subcinerea (Haworth, 1828)
Prolita sexpunctella (Fabricius, 1794)
Prolita solutella (Zeller, 1839)
Psamathocrita osseella (Stainton, 1860)
Pseudotelphusa istrella (Mann, 1866)
Pseudotelphusa paripunctella (Thunberg, 1794)
Pseudotelphusa scalella (Scopoli, 1763)
Pseudotelphusa tessella (Linnaeus, 1758)
Psoricoptera gibbosella (Zeller, 1839)
Psoricoptera speciosella Teich, 1893
Ptocheuusa abnormella (Herrich-Schäffer, 1854)
Pyncostola bohemiella (Nickerl, 1864)
Recurvaria leucatella (Clerck, 1759)
Recurvaria nanella (Denis & Schiffermüller, 1775)
Sattleria dzieduszyckii (Nowicki, 1864)
Scrobipalpa acuminatella (Sircom, 1850)
Scrobipalpa artemisiella (Treitschke, 1833)
Scrobipalpa atriplicella (Fischer von Röslerstamm, 1841)
Scrobipalpa brahmiella (Heyden, 1862)
Scrobipalpa chrysanthemella (E. Hofmann, 1867)
Scrobipalpa erichi Povolny, 1964
Scrobipalpa hyoscyamella (Stainton, 1869)
Scrobipalpa murinella (Duponchel, 1843)
Scrobipalpa nitentella (Fuchs, 1902)
Scrobipalpa obsoletella (Fischer von Röslerstamm, 1841)
Scrobipalpa ocellatella (Boyd, 1858)
Scrobipalpa pauperella (Heinemann, 1870)
Scrobipalpa proclivella (Fuchs, 1886)
Scrobipalpa salicorniae (E. Hering, 1889)
Scrobipalpa samadensis (Pfaffenzeller, 1870)
Scrobipalpopsis petasitis (Pfaffenzeller, 1867)
Scrobipalpula psilella (Herrich-Schäffer, 1854)
Scrobipalpula tussilaginis (Stainton, 1867)
Sitotroga cerealella (Olivier, 1789)
Sophronia ascalis Gozmany, 1951
Sophronia humerella (Denis & Schiffermüller, 1775)
Sophronia illustrella (Hübner, 1796)
Sophronia semicostella (Hübner, 1813)
Sophronia sicariellus (Zeller, 1839)
Stenolechia gemmella (Linnaeus, 1758)
Stomopteryx detersella (Zeller, 1847)
Stomopteryx hungaricella Gozmany, 1957
Stomopteryx remissella (Zeller, 1847)
Streyella anguinella (Herrich-Schäffer, 1861)
Syncopacma albifrontella (Heinemann, 1870)
Syncopacma azosterella (Herrich-Schäffer, 1854)
Syncopacma captivella (Herrich-Schäffer, 1854)
Syncopacma cinctella (Clerck, 1759)
Syncopacma cincticulella (Bruand, 1851)
Syncopacma coronillella (Treitschke, 1833)
Syncopacma incognitana Gozmany, 1957
Syncopacma larseniella Gozmany, 1957
Syncopacma linella (Chretien, 1904)
Syncopacma montanata Gozmany, 1957
Syncopacma ochrofasciella (Toll, 1936)
Syncopacma patruella (Mann, 1857)
Syncopacma sangiella (Stainton, 1863)
Syncopacma taeniolella (Zeller, 1839)
Syncopacma vinella (Bankes, 1898)
Syncopacma wormiella (Wolff, 1958)
Teleiodes flavimaculella (Herrich-Schäffer, 1854)
Teleiodes luculella (Hübner, 1813)
Teleiodes saltuum (Zeller, 1878)
Teleiodes vulgella (Denis & Schiffermüller, 1775)
Teleiodes wagae (Nowicki, 1860)
Teleiopsis bagriotella (Duponchel, 1840)
Teleiopsis diffinis (Haworth, 1828)
Teleiopsis terebinthinella (Herrich-Schäffer, 1856)
Thiotricha subocellea (Stephens, 1834)
Xystophora carchariella (Zeller, 1839)
Xystophora pulveratella (Herrich-Schäffer, 1854)

Geometridae
Abraxas grossulariata (Linnaeus, 1758)
Abraxas sylvata (Scopoli, 1763)
Acasis viretata (Hübner, 1799)
Aethalura punctulata (Denis & Schiffermüller, 1775)
Agriopis aurantiaria (Hübner, 1799)
Agriopis bajaria (Denis & Schiffermüller, 1775)
Agriopis leucophaearia (Denis & Schiffermüller, 1775)
Agriopis marginaria (Fabricius, 1776)
Alcis bastelbergeri (Hirschke, 1908)
Alcis jubata (Thunberg, 1788)
Alcis repandata (Linnaeus, 1758)
Alsophila aceraria (Denis & Schiffermüller, 1775)
Alsophila aescularia (Denis & Schiffermüller, 1775)
Angerona prunaria (Linnaeus, 1758)
Anticlea derivata (Denis & Schiffermüller, 1775)
Anticollix sparsata (Treitschke, 1828)
Apeira syringaria (Linnaeus, 1758)
Aplasta ononaria (Fuessly, 1783)
Aplocera annexata (Freyer, 1830)
Aplocera efformata (Guenee, 1858)
Aplocera plagiata (Linnaeus, 1758)
Aplocera praeformata (Hübner, 1826)
Aplocera simpliciata (Treitschke, 1835)
Apocheima hispidaria (Denis & Schiffermüller, 1775)
Archiearis parthenias (Linnaeus, 1761)
Arichanna melanaria (Linnaeus, 1758)
Artiora evonymaria (Denis & Schiffermüller, 1775)
Ascotis selenaria (Denis & Schiffermüller, 1775)
Asovia maeoticaria (Alphéraky, 1876)
Aspitates gilvaria (Denis & Schiffermüller, 1775)
Aspitates ochrearia (Rossi, 1794)
Asthena albulata (Hufnagel, 1767)
Asthena anseraria (Herrich-Schäffer, 1855)
Baptria tibiale (Esper, 1791)
Biston betularia (Linnaeus, 1758)
Biston strataria (Hufnagel, 1767)
Boudinotiana notha (Hübner, 1803)
Boudinotiana puella (Esper, 1787)
Bupalus piniaria (Linnaeus, 1758)
Cabera exanthemata (Scopoli, 1763)
Cabera pusaria (Linnaeus, 1758)
Campaea margaritaria (Linnaeus, 1761)
Camptogramma bilineata (Linnaeus, 1758)
Camptogramma scripturata (Hübner, 1799)
Carsia lythoxylata (Hübner, 1799)
Carsia sororiata (Hübner, 1813)
Cataclysme riguata (Hübner, 1813)
Catarhoe cuculata (Hufnagel, 1767)
Catarhoe permixtaria (Herrich-Schäffer, 1856)
Catarhoe putridaria (Herrich-Schäffer, 1852)
Catarhoe rubidata (Denis & Schiffermüller, 1775)
Cepphis advenaria (Hübner, 1790)
Chariaspilates formosaria (Eversmann, 1837)
Charissa obscurata (Denis & Schiffermüller, 1775)
Charissa pullata (Denis & Schiffermüller, 1775)
Charissa variegata (Duponchel, 1830)
Charissa ambiguata (Duponchel, 1830)
Charissa onustaria (Herrich-Schäffer, 1852)
Charissa intermedia (Wehrli, 1917)
Charissa glaucinaria (Hübner, 1799)
Chesias rufata (Fabricius, 1775)
Chiasmia aestimaria (Hübner, 1809)
Chiasmia clathrata (Linnaeus, 1758)
Chlorissa cloraria (Hübner, 1813)
Chlorissa viridata (Linnaeus, 1758)
Chloroclysta miata (Linnaeus, 1758)
Chloroclysta siterata (Hufnagel, 1767)
Chloroclystis v-ata (Haworth, 1809)
Cidaria fulvata (Forster, 1771)
Cleora cinctaria (Denis & Schiffermüller, 1775)
Cleorodes lichenaria (Hufnagel, 1767)
Coenocalpe lapidata (Hübner, 1809)
Coenotephria ablutaria (Boisduval, 1840)
Coenotephria salicata (Denis & Schiffermüller, 1775)
Coenotephria tophaceata (Denis & Schiffermüller, 1775)
Colostygia aptata (Hübner, 1813)
Colostygia aqueata (Hübner, 1813)
Colostygia kollariaria (Herrich-Schäffer, 1848)
Colostygia olivata (Denis & Schiffermüller, 1775)
Colostygia pectinataria (Knoch, 1781)
Colostygia turbata (Hübner, 1799)
Colotois pennaria (Linnaeus, 1761)
Comibaena bajularia (Denis & Schiffermüller, 1775)
Cosmorhoe ocellata (Linnaeus, 1758)
Costaconvexa polygrammata (Borkhausen, 1794)
Crocallis elinguaria (Linnaeus, 1758)
Crocallis tusciaria (Borkhausen, 1793)
Crocota niveata (Scopoli, 1763)
Cyclophora linearia (Hübner, 1799)
Cyclophora porata (Linnaeus, 1767)
Cyclophora punctaria (Linnaeus, 1758)
Cyclophora suppunctaria (Zeller, 1847)
Cyclophora albiocellaria (Hübner, 1789)
Cyclophora albipunctata (Hufnagel, 1767)
Cyclophora annularia (Fabricius, 1775)
Cyclophora pendularia (Clerck, 1759)
Cyclophora puppillaria (Hübner, 1799)
Cyclophora quercimontaria (Bastelberger, 1897)
Cyclophora ruficiliaria (Herrich-Schäffer, 1855)
Dasycorsa modesta (Staudinger, 1879)
Deileptenia ribeata (Clerck, 1759)
Digrammia rippertaria (Duponchel, 1830)
Dyscia conspersaria (Denis & Schiffermüller, 1775)
Dyscia innocentaria (Christoph, 1885)
Dysstroma citrata (Linnaeus, 1761)
Dysstroma truncata (Hufnagel, 1767)
Earophila badiata (Denis & Schiffermüller, 1775)
Ecliptopera capitata (Herrich-Schäffer, 1839)
Ecliptopera silaceata (Denis & Schiffermüller, 1775)
Ectropis crepuscularia (Denis & Schiffermüller, 1775)
Eilicrinia cordiaria (Hübner, 1790)
Eilicrinia trinotata (Metzner, 1845)
Electrophaes corylata (Thunberg, 1792)
Elophos operaria (Hübner, 1813)
Elophos dilucidaria (Denis & Schiffermüller, 1775)
Elophos vittaria (Thunberg, 1788)
Ematurga atomaria (Linnaeus, 1758)
Ennomos alniaria (Linnaeus, 1758)
Ennomos autumnaria (Werneburg, 1859)
Ennomos erosaria (Denis & Schiffermüller, 1775)
Ennomos fuscantaria (Haworth, 1809)
Ennomos quercaria (Hübner, 1813)
Ennomos quercinaria (Hufnagel, 1767)
Entephria caesiata (Denis & Schiffermüller, 1775)
Entephria cyanata (Hübner, 1809)
Entephria flavicinctata (Hübner, 1813)
Entephria infidaria (de La Harpe, 1853)
Entephria nobiliaria (Herrich-Schäffer, 1852)
Epilobophora sabinata (Geyer, 1831)
Epione repandaria (Hufnagel, 1767)
Epione vespertaria (Linnaeus, 1767)
Epirrhoe alternata (Muller, 1764)
Epirrhoe galiata (Denis & Schiffermüller, 1775)
Epirrhoe hastulata (Hübner, 1790)
Epirrhoe molluginata (Hübner, 1813)
Epirrhoe rivata (Hübner, 1813)
Epirrhoe tristata (Linnaeus, 1758)
Epirrita autumnata (Borkhausen, 1794)
Epirrita christyi (Allen, 1906)
Epirrita dilutata (Denis & Schiffermüller, 1775)
Erannis ankeraria (Staudinger, 1861)
Erannis declinans (Staudinger, 1879)
Erannis defoliaria (Clerck, 1759)
Euchoeca nebulata (Scopoli, 1763)
Eulithis mellinata (Fabricius, 1787)
Eulithis populata (Linnaeus, 1758)
Eulithis prunata (Linnaeus, 1758)
Eulithis testata (Linnaeus, 1761)
Eumannia lepraria (Rebel, 1909)
Eumannia oppositaria (Mann, 1864)
Euphyia biangulata (Haworth, 1809)
Euphyia frustata (Treitschke, 1828)
Euphyia unangulata (Haworth, 1809)
Eupithecia abbreviata Stephens, 1831
Eupithecia abietaria (Goeze, 1781)
Eupithecia absinthiata (Clerck, 1759)
Eupithecia actaeata Walderdorff, 1869
Eupithecia alliaria Staudinger, 1870
Eupithecia analoga Djakonov, 1926
Eupithecia assimilata Doubleday, 1856
Eupithecia biornata Christoph, 1867
Eupithecia breviculata (Donzel, 1837)
Eupithecia cauchiata (Duponchel, 1831)
Eupithecia centaureata (Denis & Schiffermüller, 1775)
Eupithecia conterminata (Lienig, 1846)
Eupithecia cretaceata (Packard, 1874)
Eupithecia denotata (Hübner, 1813)
Eupithecia denticulata (Treitschke, 1828)
Eupithecia distinctaria Herrich-Schäffer, 1848
Eupithecia dodoneata Guenee, 1858
Eupithecia egenaria Herrich-Schäffer, 1848
Eupithecia exiguata (Hübner, 1813)
Eupithecia expallidata Doubleday, 1856
Eupithecia extensaria (Freyer, 1844)
Eupithecia extraversaria Herrich-Schäffer, 1852
Eupithecia extremata (Fabricius, 1787)
Eupithecia fuscicostata Christoph, 1887
Eupithecia gemellata Herrich-Schäffer, 1861
Eupithecia graphata (Treitschke, 1828)
Eupithecia gratiosata Herrich-Schäffer, 1861
Eupithecia gueneata Milliere, 1862
Eupithecia haworthiata Doubleday, 1856
Eupithecia icterata (de Villers, 1789)
Eupithecia immundata (Lienig, 1846)
Eupithecia impurata (Hübner, 1813)
Eupithecia indigata (Hübner, 1813)
Eupithecia innotata (Hufnagel, 1767)
Eupithecia insigniata (Hübner, 1790)
Eupithecia intricata (Zetterstedt, 1839)
Eupithecia inturbata (Hübner, 1817)
Eupithecia irriguata (Hübner, 1813)
Eupithecia lanceata (Hübner, 1825)
Eupithecia laquaearia Herrich-Schäffer, 1848
Eupithecia lariciata (Freyer, 1841)
Eupithecia linariata (Denis & Schiffermüller, 1775)
Eupithecia millefoliata Rossler, 1866
Eupithecia mystica Dietze, 1910
Eupithecia nanata (Hübner, 1813)
Eupithecia ochridata Schutze & Pinker, 1968
Eupithecia orphnata W. Petersen, 1909
Eupithecia oxycedrata (Rambur, 1833)
Eupithecia pauxillaria Boisduval, 1840
Eupithecia pernotata Guenee, 1858
Eupithecia pimpinellata (Hübner, 1813)
Eupithecia plumbeolata (Haworth, 1809)
Eupithecia pulchellata Stephens, 1831
Eupithecia pusillata (Denis & Schiffermüller, 1775)
Eupithecia pygmaeata (Hübner, 1799)
Eupithecia pyreneata Mabille, 1871
Eupithecia satyrata (Hübner, 1813)
Eupithecia schiefereri Bohatsch, 1893
Eupithecia selinata Herrich-Schäffer, 1861
Eupithecia semigraphata Bruand, 1850
Eupithecia silenata Assmann, 1848
Eupithecia silenicolata Mabille, 1867
Eupithecia simpliciata (Haworth, 1809)
Eupithecia sinuosaria (Eversmann, 1848)
Eupithecia spissilineata (Metzner, 1846)
Eupithecia subfuscata (Haworth, 1809)
Eupithecia subumbrata (Denis & Schiffermüller, 1775)
Eupithecia succenturiata (Linnaeus, 1758)
Eupithecia tantillaria Boisduval, 1840
Eupithecia tenuiata (Hübner, 1813)
Eupithecia tripunctaria Herrich-Schäffer, 1852
Eupithecia trisignaria Herrich-Schäffer, 1848
Eupithecia undata (Freyer, 1840)
Eupithecia valerianata (Hübner, 1813)
Eupithecia variostrigata Alphéraky, 1876
Eupithecia venosata (Fabricius, 1787)
Eupithecia veratraria Herrich-Schäffer, 1848
Eupithecia virgaureata Doubleday, 1861
Eupithecia vulgata (Haworth, 1809)
Eustroma reticulata (Denis & Schiffermüller, 1775)
Fagivorina arenaria (Hufnagel, 1767)
Gagitodes sagittata (Fabricius, 1787)
Gandaritis pyraliata (Denis & Schiffermüller, 1775)
Geometra papilionaria (Linnaeus, 1758)
Glacies alpinata (Scopoli, 1763)
Glacies bentelii (Ratzer, 1890)
Glacies canaliculata (Hochenwarth, 1785)
Glacies coracina (Esper, 1805)
Glacies noricana (Wagner, 1898)
Gnopharmia stevenaria (Boisduval, 1840)
Gnophos furvata (Denis & Schiffermüller, 1775)
Gnophos obfuscata (Denis & Schiffermüller, 1775)
Gnophos dumetata Treitschke, 1827
Gymnoscelis rufifasciata (Haworth, 1809)
Heliomata glarearia (Denis & Schiffermüller, 1775)
Hemistola chrysoprasaria (Esper, 1795)
Hemithea aestivaria (Hübner, 1789)
Horisme aemulata (Hübner, 1813)
Horisme aquata (Hübner, 1813)
Horisme calligraphata (Herrich-Schäffer, 1838)
Horisme corticata (Treitschke, 1835)
Horisme radicaria (de La Harpe, 1855)
Horisme tersata (Denis & Schiffermüller, 1775)
Horisme vitalbata (Denis & Schiffermüller, 1775)
Hydrelia flammeolaria (Hufnagel, 1767)
Hydrelia sylvata (Denis & Schiffermüller, 1775)
Hydria cervinalis (Scopoli, 1763)
Hydria undulata (Linnaeus, 1758)
Hydriomena furcata (Thunberg, 1784)
Hydriomena impluviata (Denis & Schiffermüller, 1775)
Hydriomena ruberata (Freyer, 1831)
Hylaea fasciaria (Linnaeus, 1758)
Hypomecis punctinalis (Scopoli, 1763)
Hypomecis roboraria (Denis & Schiffermüller, 1775)
Hypoxystis pluviaria (Fabricius, 1787)
Idaea aureolaria (Denis & Schiffermüller, 1775)
Idaea aversata (Linnaeus, 1758)
Idaea biselata (Hufnagel, 1767)
Idaea camparia (Herrich-Schäffer, 1852)
Idaea consanguinaria (Lederer, 1853)
Idaea contiguaria (Hübner, 1799)
Idaea degeneraria (Hübner, 1799)
Idaea deversaria (Herrich-Schäffer, 1847)
Idaea dilutaria (Hübner, 1799)
Idaea dimidiata (Hufnagel, 1767)
Idaea elongaria (Rambur, 1833)
Idaea emarginata (Linnaeus, 1758)
Idaea filicata (Hübner, 1799)
Idaea fuscovenosa (Goeze, 1781)
Idaea humiliata (Hufnagel, 1767)
Idaea infirmaria (Rambur, 1833)
Idaea inquinata (Scopoli, 1763)
Idaea laevigata (Scopoli, 1763)
Idaea macilentaria (Herrich-Schäffer, 1847)
Idaea moniliata (Denis & Schiffermüller, 1775)
Idaea muricata (Hufnagel, 1767)
Idaea nitidata (Herrich-Schäffer, 1861)
Idaea obsoletaria (Rambur, 1833)
Idaea ochrata (Scopoli, 1763)
Idaea pallidata (Denis & Schiffermüller, 1775)
Idaea politaria (Hübner, 1799)
Idaea rubraria (Staudinger, 1901)
Idaea rufaria (Hübner, 1799)
Idaea rusticata (Denis & Schiffermüller, 1775)
Idaea seriata (Schrank, 1802)
Idaea sericeata (Hübner, 1813)
Idaea serpentata (Hufnagel, 1767)
Idaea spissilimbaria (Mabille, 1888)
Idaea straminata (Borkhausen, 1794)
Idaea subsericeata (Haworth, 1809)
Idaea sylvestraria (Hübner, 1799)
Idaea trigeminata (Haworth, 1809)
Isturgia arenacearia (Denis & Schiffermüller, 1775)
Isturgia murinaria (Denis & Schiffermüller, 1775)
Isturgia roraria (Fabricius, 1776)
Jodis lactearia (Linnaeus, 1758)
Jodis putata (Linnaeus, 1758)
Lampropteryx otregiata (Metcalfe, 1917)
Lampropteryx suffumata (Denis & Schiffermüller, 1775)
Larentia clavaria (Haworth, 1809)
Ligdia adustata (Denis & Schiffermüller, 1775)
Lithostege coassata (Hübner, 1825)
Lithostege farinata (Hufnagel, 1767)
Lithostege griseata (Denis & Schiffermüller, 1775)
Lobophora halterata (Hufnagel, 1767)
Lomaspilis marginata (Linnaeus, 1758)
Lomographa bimaculata (Fabricius, 1775)
Lomographa temerata (Denis & Schiffermüller, 1775)
Lycia hirtaria (Clerck, 1759)
Lycia pomonaria (Hübner, 1790)
Lycia zonaria (Denis & Schiffermüller, 1775)
Lythria cruentaria (Hufnagel, 1767)
Lythria purpuraria (Linnaeus, 1758)
Macaria alternata (Denis & Schiffermüller, 1775)
Macaria artesiaria (Denis & Schiffermüller, 1775)
Macaria brunneata (Thunberg, 1784)
Macaria carbonaria (Clerck, 1759)
Macaria liturata (Clerck, 1759)
Macaria notata (Linnaeus, 1758)
Macaria signaria (Hübner, 1809)
Macaria wauaria (Linnaeus, 1758)
Martania taeniata (Stephens, 1831)
Megaspilates mundataria (Stoll, 1782)
Melanthia alaudaria (Freyer, 1846)
Melanthia procellata (Denis & Schiffermüller, 1775)
Menophra abruptaria (Thunberg, 1792)
Mesoleuca albicillata (Linnaeus, 1758)
Mesotype didymata (Linnaeus, 1758)
Mesotype parallelolineata (Retzius, 1783)
Mesotype verberata (Scopoli, 1763)
Microloxia herbaria (Hübner, 1813)
Minoa murinata (Scopoli, 1763)
Narraga fasciolaria (Hufnagel, 1767)
Narraga tessularia (Metzner, 1845)
Nebula achromaria (de La Harpe, 1853)
Nebula nebulata (Treitschke, 1828)
Nothocasis sertata (Hübner, 1817)
Nychiodes dalmatina Wagner, 1909
Nychiodes waltheri Wagner, 1919
Nycterosea obstipata (Fabricius, 1794)
Odezia atrata (Linnaeus, 1758)
Odontopera bidentata (Clerck, 1759)
Operophtera brumata (Linnaeus, 1758)
Operophtera fagata (Scharfenberg, 1805)
Opisthograptis luteolata (Linnaeus, 1758)
Orthonama vittata (Borkhausen, 1794)
Orthostixis cribraria (Hübner, 1799)
Ourapteryx sambucaria (Linnaeus, 1758)
Palaeocrocota ostrogovichi (Caradja, 1930)
Paraboarmia viertlii (Bohatsch, 1883)
Paradarisa consonaria (Hübner, 1799)
Parectropis similaria (Hufnagel, 1767)
Pareulype berberata (Denis & Schiffermüller, 1775)
Pasiphila chloerata (Mabille, 1870)
Pasiphila debiliata (Hübner, 1817)
Pasiphila rectangulata (Linnaeus, 1758)
Pelurga comitata (Linnaeus, 1758)
Pennithera firmata (Hübner, 1822)
Perconia strigillaria (Hübner, 1787)
Peribatodes ilicaria (Geyer, 1833)
Peribatodes rhomboidaria (Denis & Schiffermüller, 1775)
Peribatodes secundaria (Denis & Schiffermüller, 1775)
Peribatodes umbraria (Hübner, 1809)
Perizoma affinitata (Stephens, 1831)
Perizoma albulata (Denis & Schiffermüller, 1775)
Perizoma alchemillata (Linnaeus, 1758)
Perizoma bifaciata (Haworth, 1809)
Perizoma blandiata (Denis & Schiffermüller, 1775)
Perizoma flavofasciata (Thunberg, 1792)
Perizoma hydrata (Treitschke, 1829)
Perizoma incultaria (Herrich-Schäffer, 1848)
Perizoma lugdunaria (Herrich-Schäffer, 1855)
Perizoma minorata (Treitschke, 1828)
Perizoma obsoletata (Herrich-Schäffer, 1838)
Petrophora chlorosata (Scopoli, 1763)
Phaiogramma etruscaria (Zeller, 1849)
Phibalapteryx virgata (Hufnagel, 1767)
Phigalia pilosaria (Denis & Schiffermüller, 1775)
Philereme transversata (Hufnagel, 1767)
Philereme vetulata (Denis & Schiffermüller, 1775)
Plagodis dolabraria (Linnaeus, 1767)
Plagodis pulveraria (Linnaeus, 1758)
Plemyria rubiginata (Denis & Schiffermüller, 1775)
Pseudopanthera macularia (Linnaeus, 1758)
Pseudoterpna pruinata (Hufnagel, 1767)
Psodos quadrifaria (Sulzer, 1776)
Pterapherapteryx sexalata (Retzius, 1783)
Pungeleria capreolaria (Denis & Schiffermüller, 1775)
Rheumaptera hastata (Linnaeus, 1758)
Rheumaptera subhastata (Nolcken, 1870)
Rhodometra sacraria (Linnaeus, 1767)
Rhodostrophia discopunctata Amsel, 1935
Rhodostrophia tabidaria (Zeller, 1847)
Rhodostrophia vibicaria (Clerck, 1759)
Schistostege decussata (Denis & Schiffermüller, 1775)
Schistostege nubilaria (Hübner, 1799)
Scopula beckeraria (Lederer, 1853)
Scopula confinaria (Herrich-Schäffer, 1847)
Scopula emutaria (Hübner, 1809)
Scopula flaccidaria (Zeller, 1852)
Scopula floslactata (Haworth, 1809)
Scopula imitaria (Hübner, 1799)
Scopula immutata (Linnaeus, 1758)
Scopula incanata (Linnaeus, 1758)
Scopula marginepunctata (Goeze, 1781)
Scopula subpunctaria (Herrich-Schäffer, 1847)
Scopula ternata Schrank, 1802
Scopula caricaria (Reutti, 1853)
Scopula corrivalaria (Kretschmar, 1862)
Scopula decorata (Denis & Schiffermüller, 1775)
Scopula immorata (Linnaeus, 1758)
Scopula nemoraria (Hübner, 1799)
Scopula nigropunctata (Hufnagel, 1767)
Scopula ornata (Scopoli, 1763)
Scopula rubiginata (Hufnagel, 1767)
Scopula submutata (Treitschke, 1828)
Scopula tessellaria (Boisduval, 1840)
Scopula turbidaria (Hübner, 1819)
Scopula turbulentaria (Staudinger, 1870)
Scopula umbelaria (Hübner, 1813)
Scopula virgulata (Denis & Schiffermüller, 1775)
Scotopteryx bipunctaria (Denis & Schiffermüller, 1775)
Scotopteryx chenopodiata (Linnaeus, 1758)
Scotopteryx coarctaria (Denis & Schiffermüller, 1775)
Scotopteryx ignorata Huemer & Hausmann, 1998
Scotopteryx luridata (Hufnagel, 1767)
Scotopteryx moeniata (Scopoli, 1763)
Scotopteryx mucronata (Scopoli, 1763)
Scotopteryx vicinaria (Duponchel, 1830)
Selenia dentaria (Fabricius, 1775)
Selenia lunularia (Hübner, 1788)
Selenia tetralunaria (Hufnagel, 1767)
Selidosema plumaria (Denis & Schiffermüller, 1775)
Siona lineata (Scopoli, 1763)
Spargania luctuata (Denis & Schiffermüller, 1775)
Stegania cararia (Hübner, 1790)
Stegania dilectaria (Hübner, 1790)
Synopsia sociaria (Hübner, 1799)
Tephronia sepiaria (Hufnagel, 1767)
Thalera fimbrialis (Scopoli, 1763)
Thera britannica (Turner, 1925)
Thera cognata (Thunberg, 1792)
Thera juniperata (Linnaeus, 1758)
Thera obeliscata (Hübner, 1787)
Thera variata (Denis & Schiffermüller, 1775)
Thera vetustata (Denis & Schiffermüller, 1775)
Therapis flavicaria (Denis & Schiffermüller, 1775)
Theria rupicapraria (Denis & Schiffermüller, 1775)
Thetidia smaragdaria (Fabricius, 1787)
Timandra comae Schmidt, 1931
Trichopteryx carpinata (Borkhausen, 1794)
Trichopteryx polycommata (Denis & Schiffermüller, 1775)
Triphosa dubitata (Linnaeus, 1758)
Triphosa sabaudiata (Duponchel, 1830)
Venusia blomeri (Curtis, 1832)
Venusia cambrica Curtis, 1839
Xanthorhoe biriviata (Borkhausen, 1794)
Xanthorhoe decoloraria (Esper, 1806)
Xanthorhoe designata (Hufnagel, 1767)
Xanthorhoe ferrugata (Clerck, 1759)
Xanthorhoe fluctuata (Linnaeus, 1758)
Xanthorhoe incursata (Hübner, 1813)
Xanthorhoe montanata (Denis & Schiffermüller, 1775)
Xanthorhoe quadrifasiata (Clerck, 1759)
Xanthorhoe spadicearia (Denis & Schiffermüller, 1775)

Glyphipterigidae
Acrolepia autumnitella Curtis, 1838
Acrolepiopsis assectella (Zeller, 1839)
Digitivalva arnicella (Heyden, 1863)
Digitivalva perlepidella (Stainton, 1849)
Digitivalva reticulella (Hübner, 1796)
Digitivalva valeriella (Snellen, 1878)
Digitivalva granitella (Treitschke, 1833)
Digitivalva occidentella (Klimesch, 1956)
Digitivalva pulicariae (Klimesch, 1956)
Glyphipterix bergstraesserella (Fabricius, 1781)
Glyphipterix danilevskii Diakonoff, 1978
Glyphipterix equitella (Scopoli, 1763)
Glyphipterix forsterella (Fabricius, 1781)
Glyphipterix haworthana (Stephens, 1834)
Glyphipterix loricatella (Treitschke, 1833)
Glyphipterix pygmaeella Rebel, 1896
Glyphipterix simpliciella (Stephens, 1834)
Glyphipterix thrasonella (Scopoli, 1763)
Orthotelia sparganella (Thunberg, 1788)

Gracillariidae
Acrocercops brongniardella (Fabricius, 1798)
Aspilapteryx limosella (Duponchel, 1843)
Aspilapteryx tringipennella (Zeller, 1839)
Callisto coffeella (Zetterstedt, 1839)
Callisto denticulella (Thunberg, 1794)
Caloptilia alchimiella (Scopoli, 1763)
Caloptilia cuculipennella (Hübner, 1796)
Caloptilia elongella (Linnaeus, 1761)
Caloptilia falconipennella (Hübner, 1813)
Caloptilia fidella (Reutti, 1853)
Caloptilia fribergensis (Fritzsche, 1871)
Caloptilia hauderi (Rebel, 1906)
Caloptilia hemidactylella (Denis & Schiffermüller, 1775)
Caloptilia populetorum (Zeller, 1839)
Caloptilia rhodinella (Herrich-Schäffer, 1855)
Caloptilia robustella Jackh, 1972
Caloptilia roscipennella (Hübner, 1796)
Caloptilia rufipennella (Hübner, 1796)
Caloptilia semifascia (Haworth, 1828)
Caloptilia stigmatella (Fabricius, 1781)
Calybites phasianipennella (Hübner, 1813)
Calybites quadrisignella (Zeller, 1839)
Cameraria ohridella Deschka & Dimic, 1986
Dialectica imperialella (Zeller, 1847)
Euspilapteryx auroguttella Stephens, 1835
Gracillaria syringella (Fabricius, 1794)
Leucospilapteryx omissella (Stainton, 1848)
Micrurapteryx gradatella (Herrich-Schäffer, 1855)
Micrurapteryx kollariella (Zeller, 1839)
Ornixola caudulatella (Zeller, 1839)
Parectopa ononidis (Zeller, 1839)
Parectopa robiniella Clemens, 1863
Parornix anglicella (Stainton, 1850)
Parornix anguliferella (Zeller, 1847)
Parornix betulae (Stainton, 1854)
Parornix carpinella (Frey, 1863)
Parornix devoniella (Stainton, 1850)
Parornix fagivora (Frey, 1861)
Parornix finitimella (Zeller, 1850)
Parornix mixta (Triberti, 1980)
Parornix petiolella (Frey, 1863)
Parornix scoticella (Stainton, 1850)
Parornix szocsi Gozmany, 1952
Parornix tenella (Rebel, 1919)
Parornix torquillella (Zeller, 1850)
Phyllocnistis extrematrix Martynova, 1955
Phyllocnistis labyrinthella (Bjerkander, 1790)
Phyllocnistis saligna (Zeller, 1839)
Phyllocnistis unipunctella (Stephens, 1834)
Phyllocnistis xenia M. Hering, 1936
Phyllonorycter abrasella (Duponchel, 1843)
Phyllonorycter acerifoliella (Zeller, 1839)
Phyllonorycter blancardella (Fabricius, 1781)
Phyllonorycter cavella (Zeller, 1846)
Phyllonorycter cerasicolella (Herrich-Schäffer, 1855)
Phyllonorycter cerasinella (Reutti, 1852)
Phyllonorycter comparella (Duponchel, 1843)
Phyllonorycter coryli (Nicelli, 1851)
Phyllonorycter corylifoliella (Hübner, 1796)
Phyllonorycter delitella (Duponchel, 1843)
Phyllonorycter emberizaepenella (Bouche, 1834)
Phyllonorycter esperella (Goeze, 1783)
Phyllonorycter fraxinella (Zeller, 1846)
Phyllonorycter froelichiella (Zeller, 1839)
Phyllonorycter geniculella (Ragonot, 1874)
Phyllonorycter harrisella (Linnaeus, 1761)
Phyllonorycter heegeriella (Zeller, 1846)
Phyllonorycter hilarella (Zetterstedt, 1839)
Phyllonorycter ilicifoliella (Duponchel, 1843)
Phyllonorycter insignitella (Zeller, 1846)
Phyllonorycter issikii (Kumata, 1963)
Phyllonorycter junoniella (Zeller, 1846)
Phyllonorycter klemannella (Fabricius, 1781)
Phyllonorycter kuhlweiniella (Zeller, 1839)
Phyllonorycter lantanella (Schrank, 1802)
Phyllonorycter lautella (Zeller, 1846)
Phyllonorycter maestingella (Muller, 1764)
Phyllonorycter mespilella (Hübner, 1805)
Phyllonorycter muelleriella (Zeller, 1839)
Phyllonorycter nicellii (Stainton, 1851)
Phyllonorycter nigrescentella (Logan, 1851)
Phyllonorycter oxyacanthae (Frey, 1856)
Phyllonorycter parisiella (Wocke, 1848)
Phyllonorycter pastorella (Zeller, 1846)
Phyllonorycter platani (Staudinger, 1870)
Phyllonorycter populifoliella (Treitschke, 1833)
Phyllonorycter quercifoliella (Zeller, 1839)
Phyllonorycter rajella (Linnaeus, 1758)
Phyllonorycter robiniella (Clemens, 1859)
Phyllonorycter roboris (Zeller, 1839)
Phyllonorycter sagitella (Bjerkander, 1790)
Phyllonorycter salicicolella (Sircom, 1848)
Phyllonorycter salictella (Zeller, 1846)
Phyllonorycter schreberella (Fabricius, 1781)
Phyllonorycter scitulella (Duponchel, 1843)
Phyllonorycter sorbi (Frey, 1855)
Phyllonorycter spinicolella (Zeller, 1846)
Phyllonorycter staintoniella (Nicelli, 1853)
Phyllonorycter stettinensis (Nicelli, 1852)
Phyllonorycter strigulatella (Lienig & Zeller, 1846)
Phyllonorycter tenerella (de Joannis, 1915)
Phyllonorycter tristrigella (Haworth, 1828)
Phyllonorycter ulmifoliella (Hübner, 1817)
Sauterina hofmanniella (Schleich, 1867)

Heliodinidae
Heliodines roesella (Linnaeus, 1758)

Heliozelidae
Antispila metallella (Denis & Schiffermüller, 1775)
Antispila treitschkiella (Fischer von Röslerstamm, 1843)
Heliozela hammoniella Sorhagen, 1885
Heliozela resplendella (Stainton, 1851)
Heliozela sericiella (Haworth, 1828)

Hepialidae
Hepialus humuli (Linnaeus, 1758)
Pharmacis carna (Denis & Schiffermüller, 1775)
Pharmacis fusconebulosa (DeGeer, 1778)
Pharmacis lupulina (Linnaeus, 1758)
Phymatopus hecta (Linnaeus, 1758)
Triodia amasinus (Herrich-Schäffer, 1851)
Triodia sylvina (Linnaeus, 1761)

Heterogynidae
Heterogynis penella (Hübner, 1819)

Incurvariidae
Alloclemensia mesospilella (Herrich-Schäffer, 1854)
Incurvaria koerneriella (Zeller, 1839)
Incurvaria masculella (Denis & Schiffermüller, 1775)
Incurvaria oehlmanniella (Hübner, 1796)
Incurvaria pectinea Haworth, 1828
Incurvaria praelatella (Denis & Schiffermüller, 1775)
Incurvaria vetulella (Zetterstedt, 1839)

Lasiocampidae
Cosmotriche lobulina (Denis & Schiffermüller, 1775)
Dendrolimus pini (Linnaeus, 1758)
Eriogaster catax (Linnaeus, 1758)
Eriogaster lanestris (Linnaeus, 1758)
Eriogaster rimicola (Denis & Schiffermüller, 1775)
Euthrix potatoria (Linnaeus, 1758)
Gastropacha quercifolia (Linnaeus, 1758)
Gastropacha populifolia (Denis & Schiffermüller, 1775)
Lasiocampa quercus (Linnaeus, 1758)
Lasiocampa eversmanni (Eversmann, 1843)
Lasiocampa trifolii (Denis & Schiffermüller, 1775)
Macrothylacia rubi (Linnaeus, 1758)
Malacosoma castrensis (Linnaeus, 1758)
Malacosoma neustria (Linnaeus, 1758)
Odonestis pruni (Linnaeus, 1758)
Phyllodesma ilicifolia (Linnaeus, 1758)
Phyllodesma tremulifolia (Hübner, 1810)
Poecilocampa populi (Linnaeus, 1758)
Trichiura crataegi (Linnaeus, 1758)

Lecithoceridae
Homaloxestis briantiella (Turati, 1879)
Lecithocera nigrana (Duponchel, 1836)
Odites ternatella (Staudinger, 1859)

Limacodidae
Apoda limacodes (Hufnagel, 1766)
Heterogenea asella (Denis & Schiffermüller, 1775)

Lyonetiidae
Leucoptera laburnella (Stainton, 1851)
Leucoptera lathyrifoliella (Stainton, 1866)
Leucoptera lustratella (Herrich-Schäffer, 1855)
Leucoptera malifoliella (O. Costa, 1836)
Leucoptera sinuella (Reutti, 1853)
Leucoptera spartifoliella (Hübner, 1813)
Lyonetia clerkella (Linnaeus, 1758)
Lyonetia ledi Wocke, 1859
Lyonetia prunifoliella (Hübner, 1796)
Lyonetia pulverulentella Zeller, 1839

Lypusidae
Lypusa maurella (Denis & Schiffermüller, 1775)
Pseudatemelia flavifrontella (Denis & Schiffermüller, 1775)
Pseudatemelia subochreella (Doubleday, 1859)
Pseudatemelia josephinae (Toll, 1956)

Micropterigidae
Micropterix aruncella (Scopoli, 1763)
Micropterix aureatella (Scopoli, 1763)
Micropterix aureoviridella (Hofner, 1898)
Micropterix calthella (Linnaeus, 1761)
Micropterix mansuetella Zeller, 1844
Micropterix myrtetella Zeller, 1850
Micropterix tunbergella (Fabricius, 1787)

Millieridae
Millieria dolosalis (Heydenreich, 1851)

Momphidae
Mompha langiella (Hübner, 1796)
Mompha idaei (Zeller, 1839)
Mompha miscella (Denis & Schiffermüller, 1775)
Mompha bradleyi Riedl, 1965
Mompha divisella Herrich-Schäffer, 1854
Mompha epilobiella (Denis & Schiffermüller, 1775)
Mompha lacteella (Stephens, 1834)
Mompha ochraceella (Curtis, 1839)
Mompha propinquella (Stainton, 1851)
Mompha sturnipennella (Treitschke, 1833)
Mompha subbistrigella (Haworth, 1828)
Mompha locupletella (Denis & Schiffermüller, 1775)
Mompha raschkiella (Zeller, 1839)
Mompha terminella (Humphreys & Westwood, 1845)

Nepticulidae
Acalyptris loranthella (Klimesch, 1937)
Bohemannia quadrimaculella (Boheman, 1853)
Ectoedemia agrimoniae (Frey, 1858)
Ectoedemia albifasciella (Heinemann, 1871)
Ectoedemia angulifasciella (Stainton, 1849)
Ectoedemia arcuatella (Herrich-Schäffer, 1855)
Ectoedemia argyropeza (Zeller, 1839)
Ectoedemia atricollis (Stainton, 1857)
Ectoedemia hannoverella (Glitz, 1872)
Ectoedemia intimella (Zeller, 1848)
Ectoedemia klimeschi (Skala, 1933)
Ectoedemia mahalebella (Klimesch, 1936)
Ectoedemia occultella (Linnaeus, 1767)
Ectoedemia rubivora (Wocke, 1860)
Ectoedemia spinosella (de Joannis, 1908)
Ectoedemia subbimaculella (Haworth, 1828)
Ectoedemia turbidella (Zeller, 1848)
Ectoedemia decentella (Herrich-Schäffer, 1855)
Ectoedemia louisella (Sircom, 1849)
Ectoedemia sericopeza (Zeller, 1839)
Ectoedemia euphorbiella (Stainton, 1869)
Ectoedemia septembrella (Stainton, 1849)
Ectoedemia atrifrontella (Stainton, 1851)
Ectoedemia longicaudella Klimesch, 1953
Enteucha acetosae (Stainton, 1854)
Simplimorpha promissa (Staudinger, 1871)
Stigmella aceris (Frey, 1857)
Stigmella aeneofasciella (Herrich-Schäffer, 1855)
Stigmella alnetella (Stainton, 1856)
Stigmella anomalella (Goeze, 1783)
Stigmella assimilella (Zeller, 1848)
Stigmella atricapitella (Haworth, 1828)
Stigmella aurella (Fabricius, 1775)
Stigmella basiguttella (Heinemann, 1862)
Stigmella betulicola (Stainton, 1856)
Stigmella carpinella (Heinemann, 1862)
Stigmella catharticella (Stainton, 1853)
Stigmella centifoliella (Zeller, 1848)
Stigmella crataegella (Klimesch, 1936)
Stigmella desperatella (Frey, 1856)
Stigmella dryadella (O. Hofmann, 1868)
Stigmella floslactella (Haworth, 1828)
Stigmella freyella (Heyden, 1858)
Stigmella glutinosae (Stainton, 1858)
Stigmella hemargyrella (Kollar, 1832)
Stigmella hybnerella (Hübner, 1796)
Stigmella incognitella (Herrich-Schäffer, 1855)
Stigmella lapponica (Wocke, 1862)
Stigmella lemniscella (Zeller, 1839)
Stigmella malella (Stainton, 1854)
Stigmella mespilicola (Frey, 1856)
Stigmella microtheriella (Stainton, 1854)
Stigmella minusculella (Herrich-Schäffer, 1855)
Stigmella nivenburgensis (Preissecker, 1942)
Stigmella nylandriella (Tengstrom, 1848)
Stigmella obliquella (Heinemann, 1862)
Stigmella oxyacanthella (Stainton, 1854)
Stigmella paliurella Gerasimov, 1937
Stigmella paradoxa (Frey, 1858)
Stigmella perpygmaeella (Doubleday, 1859)
Stigmella plagicolella (Stainton, 1854)
Stigmella prunetorum (Stainton, 1855)
Stigmella pyri (Glitz, 1865)
Stigmella regiella (Herrich-Schäffer, 1855)
Stigmella rhamnella (Herrich-Schäffer, 1860)
Stigmella rolandi van Nieukerken, 1990
Stigmella salicis (Stainton, 1854)
Stigmella samiatella (Zeller, 1839)
Stigmella sorbi (Stainton, 1861)
Stigmella speciosa (Frey, 1858)
Stigmella splendidissimella (Herrich-Schäffer, 1855)
Stigmella thuringiaca (Petry, 1904)
Stigmella tiliae (Frey, 1856)
Stigmella tityrella (Stainton, 1854)
Stigmella tormentillella (Herrich-Schäffer, 1860)
Stigmella trimaculella (Haworth, 1828)
Stigmella ulmivora (Fologne, 1860)
Stigmella viscerella (Stainton, 1853)
Trifurcula headleyella (Stainton, 1854)
Trifurcula moravica Z. & A. Lastuvka, 1994
Trifurcula pallidella (Duponchel, 1843)
Trifurcula serotinella Herrich-Schäffer, 1855
Trifurcula subnitidella (Duponchel, 1843)

Noctuidae
Abrostola agnorista Dufay, 1956
Abrostola asclepiadis (Denis & Schiffermüller, 1775)
Abrostola tripartita (Hufnagel, 1766)
Abrostola triplasia (Linnaeus, 1758)
Acontia lucida (Hufnagel, 1766)
Acontia candefacta (Hübner, 1831)
Acontia trabealis (Scopoli, 1763)
Acontia melanura (Tauscher, 1809)
Acontia titania (Esper, 1798)
Acontiola moldavicola (Herrich-Schäffer, 1851)
Acosmetia caliginosa (Hübner, 1813)
Acronicta aceris (Linnaeus, 1758)
Acronicta leporina (Linnaeus, 1758)
Acronicta strigosa (Denis & Schiffermüller, 1775)
Acronicta alni (Linnaeus, 1767)
Acronicta cuspis (Hübner, 1813)
Acronicta psi (Linnaeus, 1758)
Acronicta tridens (Denis & Schiffermüller, 1775)
Acronicta auricoma (Denis & Schiffermüller, 1775)
Acronicta cinerea (Hufnagel, 1766)
Acronicta euphorbiae (Denis & Schiffermüller, 1775)
Acronicta menyanthidis (Esper, 1789)
Acronicta orientalis (Mann, 1862)
Acronicta rumicis (Linnaeus, 1758)
Actebia praecox (Linnaeus, 1758)
Actebia fugax (Treitschke, 1825)
Actinotia polyodon (Clerck, 1759)
Actinotia radiosa (Esper, 1804)
Aedia funesta (Esper, 1786)
Aedia leucomelas (Linnaeus, 1758)
Aedophron rhodites (Eversmann, 1851)
Aegle kaekeritziana (Hübner, 1799)
Aegle semicana (Esper, 1798)
Agrochola lychnidis (Denis & Schiffermüller, 1775)
Agrochola helvola (Linnaeus, 1758)
Agrochola humilis (Denis & Schiffermüller, 1775)
Agrochola litura (Linnaeus, 1758)
Agrochola nitida (Denis & Schiffermüller, 1775)
Agrochola lota (Clerck, 1759)
Agrochola macilenta (Hübner, 1809)
Agrochola laevis (Hübner, 1803)
Agrochola circellaris (Hufnagel, 1766)
Agrotis bigramma (Esper, 1790)
Agrotis catalaunensis (Milliere, 1873)
Agrotis cinerea (Denis & Schiffermüller, 1775)
Agrotis clavis (Hufnagel, 1766)
Agrotis desertorum Boisduval, 1840
Agrotis exclamationis (Linnaeus, 1758)
Agrotis ipsilon (Hufnagel, 1766)
Agrotis obesa Boisduval, 1829
Agrotis segetum (Denis & Schiffermüller, 1775)
Agrotis trifurca Eversmann, 1837
Agrotis trux (Hübner, 1824)
Agrotis vestigialis (Hufnagel, 1766)
Allophyes oxyacanthae (Linnaeus, 1758)
Ammoconia caecimacula (Denis & Schiffermüller, 1775)
Amphipoea fucosa (Freyer, 1830)
Amphipoea oculea (Linnaeus, 1761)
Amphipyra berbera Rungs, 1949
Amphipyra livida (Denis & Schiffermüller, 1775)
Amphipyra micans Lederer, 1857
Amphipyra perflua (Fabricius, 1787)
Amphipyra pyramidea (Linnaeus, 1758)
Amphipyra stix Herrich-Schäffer, 1850
Amphipyra tetra (Fabricius, 1787)
Amphipyra tragopoginis (Clerck, 1759)
Amphipyra cinnamomea (Goeze, 1781)
Anaplectoides prasina (Denis & Schiffermüller, 1775)
Anarta myrtilli (Linnaeus, 1761)
Anarta dianthi (Tauscher, 1809)
Anarta stigmosa (Christoph, 1887)
Anarta trifolii (Hufnagel, 1766)
Anorthoa munda (Denis & Schiffermüller, 1775)
Anthracia eriopoda (Herrich-Schäffer, 1851)
Antitype chi (Linnaeus, 1758)
Antitype suda (Geyer, 1832)
Apamea anceps (Denis & Schiffermüller, 1775)
Apamea aquila Donzel, 1837
Apamea crenata (Hufnagel, 1766)
Apamea epomidion (Haworth, 1809)
Apamea furva (Denis & Schiffermüller, 1775)
Apamea illyria Freyer, 1846
Apamea lateritia (Hufnagel, 1766)
Apamea lithoxylaea (Denis & Schiffermüller, 1775)
Apamea maillardi (Geyer, 1834)
Apamea monoglypha (Hufnagel, 1766)
Apamea oblonga (Haworth, 1809)
Apamea platinea (Treitschke, 1825)
Apamea remissa (Hübner, 1809)
Apamea rubrirena (Treitschke, 1825)
Apamea scolopacina (Esper, 1788)
Apamea sordens (Hufnagel, 1766)
Apamea sublustris (Esper, 1788)
Apamea syriaca (Osthelder, 1933)
Apamea unanimis (Hübner, 1813)
Apamea zeta (Treitschke, 1825)
Apaustis rupicola (Denis & Schiffermüller, 1775)
Aporophyla australis (Boisduval, 1829)
Aporophyla lutulenta (Denis & Schiffermüller, 1775)
Aporophyla nigra (Haworth, 1809)
Apterogenum ypsillon (Denis & Schiffermüller, 1775)
Archanara dissoluta (Treitschke, 1825)
Archanara neurica (Hübner, 1808)
Arenostola phragmitidis (Hübner, 1803)
Asteroscopus sphinx (Hufnagel, 1766)
Asteroscopus syriaca (Warren, 1910)
Atethmia ambusta (Denis & Schiffermüller, 1775)
Atethmia centrago (Haworth, 1809)
Athetis furvula (Hübner, 1808)
Athetis gluteosa (Treitschke, 1835)
Athetis pallustris (Hübner, 1808)
Athetis lepigone (Moschler, 1860)
Atypha pulmonaris (Esper, 1790)
Auchmis detersa (Esper, 1787)
Autographa bractea (Denis & Schiffermüller, 1775)
Autographa gamma (Linnaeus, 1758)
Autographa jota (Linnaeus, 1758)
Autographa pulchrina (Haworth, 1809)
Axylia putris (Linnaeus, 1761)
Brachionycha nubeculosa (Esper, 1785)
Brachylomia viminalis (Fabricius, 1776)
Bryophila ereptricula Treitschke, 1825
Bryophila raptricula (Denis & Schiffermüller, 1775)
Bryophila ravula (Hübner, 1813)
Bryophila rectilinea (Warren, 1909)
Bryophila tephrocharis (Boursin, 1953)
Bryophila domestica (Hufnagel, 1766)
Calamia tridens (Hufnagel, 1766)
Calliergis ramosa (Esper, 1786)
Callopistria juventina (Stoll, 1782)
Callopistria latreillei (Duponchel, 1827)
Calophasia lunula (Hufnagel, 1766)
Calophasia opalina (Esper, 1793)
Calophasia platyptera (Esper, 1788)
Caradrina morpheus (Hufnagel, 1766)
Caradrina gilva (Donzel, 1837)
Caradrina pertinax Staudinger, 1879
Caradrina clavipalpis Scopoli, 1763
Caradrina selini Boisduval, 1840
Caradrina albina Eversmann, 1848
Caradrina aspersa Rambur, 1834
Caradrina kadenii Freyer, 1836
Caradrina terrea Freyer, 1840
Cardepia hartigi Parenzan, 1981
Ceramica pisi (Linnaeus, 1758)
Cerapteryx graminis (Linnaeus, 1758)
Cerastis leucographa (Denis & Schiffermüller, 1775)
Cerastis rubricosa (Denis & Schiffermüller, 1775)
Cervyna cervago Eversmann, 1844
Charanyca trigrammica (Hufnagel, 1766)
Charanyca ferruginea (Esper, 1785)
Chersotis cuprea (Denis & Schiffermüller, 1775)
Chersotis fimbriola (Esper, 1803)
Chersotis laeta (Rebel, 1904)
Chersotis margaritacea (Villers, 1789)
Chersotis multangula (Hübner, 1803)
Chersotis rectangula (Denis & Schiffermüller, 1775)
Chilodes maritima (Tauscher, 1806)
Chloantha hyperici (Denis & Schiffermüller, 1775)
Chrysodeixis chalcites (Esper, 1789)
Cleoceris scoriacea (Esper, 1789)
Coenobia rufa (Haworth, 1809)
Colocasia coryli (Linnaeus, 1758)
Conisania cervina (Eversmann, 1842)
Conisania leineri (Freyer, 1836)
Conisania poelli Stertz, 1915
Conisania luteago (Denis & Schiffermüller, 1775)
Conistra ligula (Esper, 1791)
Conistra rubiginosa (Scopoli, 1763)
Conistra vaccinii (Linnaeus, 1761)
Conistra veronicae (Hübner, 1813)
Conistra erythrocephala (Denis & Schiffermüller, 1775)
Conistra rubiginea (Denis & Schiffermüller, 1775)
Conistra ragusae (Failla-Tedaldi, 1890)
Cornutiplusia circumflexa (Linnaeus, 1767)
Cosmia trapezina (Linnaeus, 1758)
Cosmia diffinis (Linnaeus, 1767)
Cosmia pyralina (Denis & Schiffermüller, 1775)
Cosmia confinis Herrich-Schäffer, 1849
Cosmia affinis (Linnaeus, 1767)
Craniophora ligustri (Denis & Schiffermüller, 1775)
Craniophora pontica (Staudinger, 1878)
Cryphia fraudatricula (Hübner, 1803)
Cryphia receptricula (Hübner, 1803)
Cryphia algae (Fabricius, 1775)
Cryphia ochsi (Boursin, 1940)
Cucullia celsiae Herrich-Schäffer, 1850
Cucullia absinthii (Linnaeus, 1761)
Cucullia argentea (Hufnagel, 1766)
Cucullia artemisiae (Hufnagel, 1766)
Cucullia asteris (Denis & Schiffermüller, 1775)
Cucullia balsamitae Boisduval, 1840
Cucullia biornata Fischer von Waldheim, 1840
Cucullia campanulae Freyer, 1831
Cucullia chamomillae (Denis & Schiffermüller, 1775)
Cucullia dracunculi (Hübner, 1813)
Cucullia fraudatrix Eversmann, 1837
Cucullia gnaphalii (Hübner, 1813)
Cucullia lactucae (Denis & Schiffermüller, 1775)
Cucullia lucifuga (Denis & Schiffermüller, 1775)
Cucullia mixta Freyer, 1841
Cucullia pustulata Eversmann, 1842
Cucullia santonici (Hübner, 1813)
Cucullia scopariae Dorfmeister, 1853
Cucullia tanaceti (Denis & Schiffermüller, 1775)
Cucullia umbratica (Linnaeus, 1758)
Cucullia xeranthemi Boisduval, 1840
Cucullia blattariae (Esper, 1790)
Cucullia gozmanyi (G. Ronkay & L. Ronkay, 1994)
Cucullia lanceolata (Villers, 1789)
Cucullia lychnitis Rambur, 1833
Cucullia prenanthis Boisduval, 1840
Cucullia scrophulariae (Denis & Schiffermüller, 1775)
Cucullia verbasci (Linnaeus, 1758)
Dasypolia templi (Thunberg, 1792)
Deltote bankiana (Fabricius, 1775)
Deltote deceptoria (Scopoli, 1763)
Deltote uncula (Clerck, 1759)
Deltote pygarga (Hufnagel, 1766)
Denticucullus pygmina (Haworth, 1809)
Diachrysia chrysitis (Linnaeus, 1758)
Diachrysia chryson (Esper, 1789)
Diachrysia nadeja (Oberthür, 1880)
Diachrysia stenochrysis (Warren, 1913)
Diachrysia zosimi (Hübner, 1822)
Diarsia brunnea (Denis & Schiffermüller, 1775)
Diarsia dahlii (Hübner, 1813)
Diarsia florida (F. Schmidt, 1859)
Diarsia mendica (Fabricius, 1775)
Diarsia rubi (Vieweg, 1790)
Dichagyris flammatra (Denis & Schiffermüller, 1775)
Dichagyris musiva (Hübner, 1803)
Dichagyris candelisequa (Denis & Schiffermüller, 1775)
Dichagyris flavina (Herrich-Schäffer, 1852)
Dichagyris forcipula (Denis & Schiffermüller, 1775)
Dichagyris melanura (Kollar, 1846)
Dichagyris nigrescens (Hofner, 1888)
Dichagyris orientis (Alphéraky, 1882)
Dichagyris renigera (Hübner, 1808)
Dichagyris signifera (Denis & Schiffermüller, 1775)
Dichonia aeruginea (Hübner, 1808)
Dichonia convergens (Denis & Schiffermüller, 1775)
Dicycla oo (Linnaeus, 1758)
Diloba caeruleocephala (Linnaeus, 1758)
Dioszeghyana schmidti (Dioszeghy, 1935)
Divaena haywardi (Tams, 1926)
Dryobotodes carbonis Wagner, 1931
Dryobotodes eremita (Fabricius, 1775)
Dryobotodes monochroma (Esper, 1790)
Dypterygia scabriuscula (Linnaeus, 1758)
Egira conspicillaris (Linnaeus, 1758)
Egira tibori Hreblay, 1994
Elaphria venustula (Hübner, 1790)
Enargia abluta (Hübner, 1808)
Enargia paleacea (Esper, 1788)
Enterpia laudeti (Boisduval, 1840)
Eogena contaminei (Eversmann, 1847)
Epilecta linogrisea (Denis & Schiffermüller, 1775)
Epimecia ustula (Freyer, 1835)
Epipsilia grisescens (Fabricius, 1794)
Epipsilia latens (Hübner, 1809)
Episema glaucina (Esper, 1789)
Episema korsakovi (Christoph, 1885)
Episema lederi Christoph, 1885
Episema tersa (Denis & Schiffermüller, 1775)
Eremobia ochroleuca (Denis & Schiffermüller, 1775)
Eremohadena immunda (Eversmann, 1842)
Eucarta amethystina (Hübner, 1803)
Eucarta virgo (Treitschke, 1835)
Euchalcia consona (Fabricius, 1787)
Euchalcia modestoides Poole, 1989
Euchalcia variabilis (Piller, 1783)
Eugnorisma depuncta (Linnaeus, 1761)
Eugnorisma pontica (Staudinger, 1892)
Eugraphe sigma (Denis & Schiffermüller, 1775)
Euplexia lucipara (Linnaeus, 1758)
Eupsilia transversa (Hufnagel, 1766)
Eurois occulta (Linnaeus, 1758)
Euxoa aquilina (Denis & Schiffermüller, 1775)
Euxoa birivia (Denis & Schiffermüller, 1775)
Euxoa conspicua (Hübner, 1824)
Euxoa cos (Hübner, 1824)
Euxoa diaphora Boursin, 1928
Euxoa distinguenda (Lederer, 1857)
Euxoa glabella Wagner, 1930
Euxoa hastifera (Donzel, 1847)
Euxoa mustelina (Christoph, 1877)
Euxoa nigricans (Linnaeus, 1761)
Euxoa nigrofusca (Esper, 1788)
Euxoa obelisca (Denis & Schiffermüller, 1775)
Euxoa recussa (Hübner, 1817)
Euxoa segnilis (Duponchel, 1837)
Euxoa temera (Hübner, 1808)
Euxoa tritici (Linnaeus, 1761)
Euxoa vitta (Esper, 1789)
Fabula zollikoferi (Freyer, 1836)
Globia algae (Esper, 1789)
Globia sparganii (Esper, 1790)
Gortyna borelii Pierret, 1837
Gortyna flavago (Denis & Schiffermüller, 1775)
Gortyna moesiaca Herrich-Schäffer, 1849
Graphiphora augur (Fabricius, 1775)
Griposia aprilina (Linnaeus, 1758)
Hada plebeja (Linnaeus, 1761)
Hadena irregularis (Hufnagel, 1766)
Hadena perplexa (Denis & Schiffermüller, 1775)
Hadena silenes (Hübner, 1822)
Hadena syriaca (Osthelder, 1933)
Hadena albimacula (Borkhausen, 1792)
Hadena caesia (Denis & Schiffermüller, 1775)
Hadena capsincola (Denis & Schiffermüller, 1775)
Hadena compta (Denis & Schiffermüller, 1775)
Hadena confusa (Hufnagel, 1766)
Hadena filograna (Esper, 1788)
Hadena magnolii (Boisduval, 1829)
Hecatera bicolorata (Hufnagel, 1766)
Hecatera cappa (Hübner, 1809)
Hecatera dysodea (Denis & Schiffermüller, 1775)
Helicoverpa armigera (Hübner, 1808)
Heliothis adaucta Butler, 1878
Heliothis incarnata Freyer, 1838
Heliothis maritima Graslin, 1855
Heliothis nubigera Herrich-Schäffer, 1851
Heliothis ononis (Denis & Schiffermüller, 1775)
Heliothis peltigera (Denis & Schiffermüller, 1775)
Heliothis viriplaca (Hufnagel, 1766)
Helivictoria victorina (Sodoffsky, 1849)
Helotropha leucostigma (Hübner, 1808)
Hoplodrina ambigua (Denis & Schiffermüller, 1775)
Hoplodrina blanda (Denis & Schiffermüller, 1775)
Hoplodrina octogenaria (Goeze, 1781)
Hoplodrina respersa (Denis & Schiffermüller, 1775)
Hoplodrina superstes (Ochsenheimer, 1816)
Hydraecia micacea (Esper, 1789)
Hydraecia osseola Staudinger, 1882
Hydraecia petasitis Doubleday, 1847
Hydraecia ultima Holst, 1965
Hyppa rectilinea (Esper, 1788)
Hyssia cavernosa (Eversmann, 1842)
Ipimorpha retusa (Linnaeus, 1761)
Ipimorpha subtusa (Denis & Schiffermüller, 1775)
Jodia croceago (Denis & Schiffermüller, 1775)
Lacanobia contigua (Denis & Schiffermüller, 1775)
Lacanobia suasa (Denis & Schiffermüller, 1775)
Lacanobia thalassina (Hufnagel, 1766)
Lacanobia aliena (Hübner, 1809)
Lacanobia blenna (Hübner, 1824)
Lacanobia oleracea (Linnaeus, 1758)
Lacanobia praedita (Hübner, 1813)
Lacanobia splendens (Hübner, 1808)
Lacanobia w-latinum (Hufnagel, 1766)
Lamprosticta culta (Denis & Schiffermüller, 1775)
Lamprotes c-aureum (Knoch, 1781)
Lasionycta imbecilla (Fabricius, 1794)
Lasionycta proxima (Hübner, 1809)
Lateroligia ophiogramma (Esper, 1794)
Lenisa geminipuncta (Haworth, 1809)
Leucania loreyi (Duponchel, 1827)
Leucania comma (Linnaeus, 1761)
Leucania obsoleta (Hübner, 1803)
Leucania putrescens (Hübner, 1824)
Leucania zeae (Duponchel, 1827)
Lithophane consocia (Borkhausen, 1792)
Lithophane furcifera (Hufnagel, 1766)
Lithophane lamda (Fabricius, 1787)
Lithophane merckii (Rambur, 1832)
Lithophane ornitopus (Hufnagel, 1766)
Lithophane semibrunnea (Haworth, 1809)
Lithophane socia (Hufnagel, 1766)
Litoligia literosa (Haworth, 1809)
Luperina dumerilii (Duponchel, 1826)
Luperina rubella (Duponchel, 1835)
Luperina testacea (Denis & Schiffermüller, 1775)
Lycophotia molothina (Esper, 1789)
Lycophotia porphyrea (Denis & Schiffermüller, 1775)
Macdunnoughia confusa (Stephens, 1850)
Mamestra brassicae (Linnaeus, 1758)
Meganephria bimaculosa (Linnaeus, 1767)
Melanchra persicariae (Linnaeus, 1761)
Mesapamea secalella Remm, 1983
Mesapamea secalis (Linnaeus, 1758)
Mesogona acetosellae (Denis & Schiffermüller, 1775)
Mesogona oxalina (Hübner, 1803)
Mesoligia furuncula (Denis & Schiffermüller, 1775)
Mesotrosta signalis (Treitschke, 1829)
Mniotype adusta (Esper, 1790)
Mniotype satura (Denis & Schiffermüller, 1775)
Moma alpium (Osbeck, 1778)
Mormo maura (Linnaeus, 1758)
Mycteroplus puniceago (Boisduval, 1840)
Mythimna albipuncta (Denis & Schiffermüller, 1775)
Mythimna congrua (Hübner, 1817)
Mythimna ferrago (Fabricius, 1787)
Mythimna l-album (Linnaeus, 1767)
Mythimna conigera (Denis & Schiffermüller, 1775)
Mythimna impura (Hübner, 1808)
Mythimna pallens (Linnaeus, 1758)
Mythimna pudorina (Denis & Schiffermüller, 1775)
Mythimna straminea (Treitschke, 1825)
Mythimna turca (Linnaeus, 1761)
Mythimna vitellina (Hübner, 1808)
Mythimna unipuncta (Haworth, 1809)
Mythimna alopecuri (Boisduval, 1840)
Mythimna sicula (Treitschke, 1835)
Naenia typica (Linnaeus, 1758)
Noctua comes Hübner, 1813
Noctua fimbriata (Schreber, 1759)
Noctua interjecta Hübner, 1803
Noctua interposita (Hübner, 1790)
Noctua janthe (Borkhausen, 1792)
Noctua janthina Denis & Schiffermüller, 1775
Noctua orbona (Hufnagel, 1766)
Noctua pronuba (Linnaeus, 1758)
Noctua tertia Mentzer & al., 1991
Noctua tirrenica Biebinger, Speidel & Hanigk, 1983
Nonagria typhae (Thunberg, 1784)
Nyctobrya amasina Draudt, 1931
Nyctobrya muralis (Forster, 1771)
Ochropleura leucogaster (Freyer, 1831)
Ochropleura plecta (Linnaeus, 1761)
Oligia fasciuncula (Haworth, 1809)
Oligia latruncula (Denis & Schiffermüller, 1775)
Oligia strigilis (Linnaeus, 1758)Hübner
Oligia versicolor (Borkhausen, 1792)
Olivenebula subsericata (Herrich-Schäffer, 1861)
Omia cymbalariae (Hübner, 1809)
Omphalophana antirrhinii (Hübner, 1803)
Oncocnemis confusa (Freyer, 1839)
Opigena polygona (Denis & Schiffermüller, 1775)
Orbona fragariae Vieweg, 1790
Oria musculosa (Hübner, 1808)
Orthosia gracilis (Denis & Schiffermüller, 1775)
Orthosia opima (Hübner, 1809)
Orthosia cerasi (Fabricius, 1775)
Orthosia cruda (Denis & Schiffermüller, 1775)
Orthosia miniosa (Denis & Schiffermüller, 1775)
Orthosia populeti (Fabricius, 1775)
Orthosia incerta (Hufnagel, 1766)
Orthosia gothica (Linnaeus, 1758)
Oxicesta geographica (Fabricius, 1787)
Oxytripia orbiculosa (Esper, 1799)
Pabulatrix pabulatricula (Brahm, 1791)
Pachetra sagittigera (Hufnagel, 1766)
Panchrysia aurea (Hübner, 1803)
Panchrysia v-argenteum (Esper, 1798)
Panemeria tenebrata (Scopoli, 1763)
Panemeria tenebromorpha Rakosy, Hentscholek & Huber, 1996
Panolis flammea (Denis & Schiffermüller, 1775)
Panthea coenobita (Esper, 1785)
Papestra biren (Goeze, 1781)
Paradiarsia punicea (Hübner, 1803)
Parastichtis suspecta (Hübner, 1817)
Peridroma saucia (Hübner, 1808)
Perigrapha i-cinctum (Denis & Schiffermüller, 1775)
Periphanes delphinii (Linnaeus, 1758)
Periphanes cora (Eversmann, 1837)
Phlogophora meticulosa (Linnaeus, 1758)
Phlogophora scita (Hübner, 1790)
Photedes captiuncula (Treitschke, 1825)
Photedes extrema (Hübner, 1809)
Photedes fluxa (Hübner, 1809)
Photedes minima (Haworth, 1809)
Photedes morrisii (Dale, 1837)
Phyllophila obliterata (Rambur, 1833)
Plusia festucae (Linnaeus, 1758)
Plusia putnami (Grote, 1873)
Plusidia cheiranthi (Tauscher, 1809)
Polia bombycina (Hufnagel, 1766)
Polia cherrug Rakosy & Wieser, 1997
Polia hepatica (Clerck, 1759)
Polia nebulosa (Hufnagel, 1766)
Polychrysia moneta (Fabricius, 1787)
Polymixis trisignata (Menetries, 1847)
Polymixis flavicincta (Denis & Schiffermüller, 1775)
Polymixis polymita (Linnaeus, 1761)
Polymixis rufocincta (Geyer, 1828)
Polymixis xanthomista (Hübner, 1819)
Polyphaenis sericata (Esper, 1787)
Protolampra sobrina (Duponchel, 1843)
Protoschinia scutosa (Denis & Schiffermüller, 1775)
Pseudeustrotia candidula (Denis & Schiffermüller, 1775)
Pseudluperina pozzii (Curo, 1883)
Pyrrhia purpura (Hübner, 1817)
Pyrrhia umbra (Hufnagel, 1766)
Rhizedra lutosa (Hübner, 1803)
Rhyacia arenacea (Hampson, 1907)
Rhyacia lucipeta (Denis & Schiffermüller, 1775)
Rhyacia simulans (Hufnagel, 1766)
Rileyiana fovea (Treitschke, 1825)
Saragossa porosa (Eversmann, 1854)
Saragossa siccanorum (Staudinger, 1870)
Schinia cardui (Hübner, 1790)
Schinia cognata (Freyer, 1833)
Scotochrosta pulla (Denis & Schiffermüller, 1775)
Sedina buettneri (E. Hering, 1858)
Senta flammea (Curtis, 1828)
Sidemia spilogramma (Rambur, 1871)
Sideridis rivularis (Fabricius, 1775)
Sideridis implexa (Hübner, 1809)
Sideridis reticulata (Goeze, 1781)
Sideridis lampra (Schawerda, 1913)
Sideridis turbida (Esper, 1790)
Simyra albovenosa (Goeze, 1781)
Simyra dentinosa Freyer, 1838
Simyra nervosa (Denis & Schiffermüller, 1775)
Spaelotis ravida (Denis & Schiffermüller, 1775)
Spaelotis suecica (Aurivillius, 1890)
Spodoptera exigua (Hübner, 1808)
Standfussiana lucernea (Linnaeus, 1758)
Staurophora celsia (Linnaeus, 1758)
Subacronicta megacephala (Denis & Schiffermüller, 1775)
Syngrapha interrogationis (Linnaeus, 1758)
Syngrapha microgamma (Hübner, 1823)
Teinoptera olivina (Herrich-Schäffer, 1852)
Thalpophila matura (Hufnagel, 1766)
Tholera cespitis (Denis & Schiffermüller, 1775)
Tholera decimalis (Poda, 1761)
Tiliacea aurago (Denis & Schiffermüller, 1775)
Tiliacea citrago (Linnaeus, 1758)
Tiliacea sulphurago (Denis & Schiffermüller, 1775)
Trachea atriplicis (Linnaeus, 1758)
Trichoplusia ni (Hübner, 1803)
Trichosea ludifica (Linnaeus, 1758)
Tyta luctuosa (Denis & Schiffermüller, 1775)
Ulochlaena hirta (Hübner, 1813)
Valeria oleagina (Denis & Schiffermüller, 1775)
Xanthia gilvago (Denis & Schiffermüller, 1775)
Xanthia icteritia (Hufnagel, 1766)
Xanthia ocellaris (Borkhausen, 1792)
Xanthia castanea Osthelder, 1933
Xanthia ruticilla (Esper, 1791)
Xanthia togata (Esper, 1788)
Xestia ashworthii (Doubleday, 1855)
Xestia c-nigrum (Linnaeus, 1758)
Xestia ditrapezium (Denis & Schiffermüller, 1775)
Xestia triangulum (Hufnagel, 1766)
Xestia rhaetica (Staudinger, 1871)
Xestia speciosa (Hübner, 1813)
Xestia baja (Denis & Schiffermüller, 1775)
Xestia castanea (Esper, 1798)
Xestia cohaesa (Herrich-Schäffer, 1849)
Xestia collina (Boisduval, 1840)
Xestia ochreago (Hübner, 1809)
Xestia stigmatica (Hübner, 1813)
Xestia trifida (Fischer v. Waldheim, 1820)
Xestia xanthographa (Denis & Schiffermüller, 1775)
Xylena solidaginis (Hübner, 1803)
Xylena exsoleta (Linnaeus, 1758)
Xylena lunifera Warren, 1910
Xylena vetusta (Hübner, 1813)
Xylocampa areola (Esper, 1789)

Nolidae
Bena bicolorana (Fuessly, 1775)
Earias clorana (Linnaeus, 1761)
Earias vernana (Fabricius, 1787)
Meganola albula (Denis & Schiffermüller, 1775)
Meganola kolbi (Daniel, 1935)
Meganola strigula (Denis & Schiffermüller, 1775)
Meganola togatulalis (Hübner, 1796)
Nola aerugula (Hübner, 1793)
Nola chlamitulalis (Hübner, 1813)
Nola cicatricalis (Treitschke, 1835)
Nola confusalis (Herrich-Schäffer, 1847)
Nola cristatula (Hübner, 1793)
Nola cucullatella (Linnaeus, 1758)
Nycteola asiatica (Krulikovsky, 1904)
Nycteola columbana (Turner, 1925)
Nycteola degenerana (Hübner, 1799)
Nycteola revayana (Scopoli, 1772)
Nycteola siculana (Fuchs, 1899)
Pseudoips prasinana (Linnaeus, 1758)

Notodontidae
Cerura erminea (Esper, 1783)
Cerura vinula (Linnaeus, 1758)
Clostera anachoreta (Denis & Schiffermüller, 1775)
Clostera anastomosis (Linnaeus, 1758)
Clostera curtula (Linnaeus, 1758)
Clostera pigra (Hufnagel, 1766)
Dicranura ulmi (Denis & Schiffermüller, 1775)
Drymonia dodonaea (Denis & Schiffermüller, 1775)
Drymonia obliterata (Esper, 1785)
Drymonia querna (Denis & Schiffermüller, 1775)
Drymonia ruficornis (Hufnagel, 1766)
Drymonia velitaris (Hufnagel, 1766)
Furcula bicuspis (Borkhausen, 1790)
Furcula bifida (Brahm, 1787)
Furcula furcula (Clerck, 1759)
Gluphisia crenata (Esper, 1785)
Harpyia milhauseri (Fabricius, 1775)
Leucodonta bicoloria (Denis & Schiffermüller, 1775)
Notodonta dromedarius (Linnaeus, 1767)
Notodonta torva (Hübner, 1803)
Notodonta tritophus (Denis & Schiffermüller, 1775)
Notodonta ziczac (Linnaeus, 1758)
Odontosia carmelita (Esper, 1799)
Paradrymonia vittata (Staudinger, 1892)
Peridea anceps (Goeze, 1781)
Peridea korbi (Rebel, 1918)
Phalera bucephala (Linnaeus, 1758)
Phalera bucephaloides (Ochsenheimer, 1810)
Pheosia gnoma (Fabricius, 1776)
Pheosia tremula (Clerck, 1759)
Pterostoma palpina (Clerck, 1759)
Ptilodon capucina (Linnaeus, 1758)
Ptilodon cucullina (Denis & Schiffermüller, 1775)
Ptilophora plumigera (Denis & Schiffermüller, 1775)
Spatalia argentina (Denis & Schiffermüller, 1775)
Stauropus fagi (Linnaeus, 1758)
Thaumetopoea pinivora (Treitschke, 1834)
Thaumetopoea pityocampa (Denis & Schiffermüller, 1775)
Thaumetopoea processionea (Linnaeus, 1758)

Oecophoridae
Alabonia geoffrella (Linnaeus, 1767)
Alabonia staintoniella (Zeller, 1850)
Aplota nigricans (Zeller, 1852)
Batia lambdella (Donovan, 1793)
Batia lunaris (Haworth, 1828)
Bisigna procerella (Denis & Schiffermüller, 1775)
Borkhausenia fuscescens (Haworth, 1828)
Borkhausenia luridicomella (Herrich-Schäffer, 1856)
Borkhausenia minutella (Linnaeus, 1758)
Crassa tinctella (Hübner, 1796)
Crassa unitella (Hübner, 1796)
Crossotocera wagnerella Zerny, 1930
Dasycera krueperella Staudinger, 1870
Dasycera oliviella (Fabricius, 1794)
Decantha borkhausenii (Zeller, 1839)
Denisia albimaculea (Haworth, 1828)
Denisia augustella (Hübner, 1796)
Denisia luctuosella (Duponchel, 1840)
Denisia nubilosella (Herrich-Schäffer, 1854)
Denisia similella (Hübner, 1796)
Denisia stipella (Linnaeus, 1758)
Denisia stroemella (Fabricius, 1779)
Deuterogonia pudorina (Wocke, 1857)
Endrosis sarcitrella (Linnaeus, 1758)
Epicallima bruandella (Ragonot, 1889)
Epicallima formosella (Denis & Schiffermüller, 1775)
Esperia sulphurella (Fabricius, 1775)
Fabiola pokornyi (Nickerl, 1864)
Harpella forficella (Scopoli, 1763)
Hofmannophila pseudospretella (Stainton, 1849)
Holoscolia huebneri Kocak, 1980
Kasyniana diminutella (Rebel, 1931)
Metalampra cinnamomea (Zeller, 1839)
Minetia adamczewskii (Toll, 1956)
Minetia criella (Treitschke, 1835)
Minetia crinitus (Fabricius, 1798)
Minetia labiosella (Hübner, 1810)
Oecophora bractella (Linnaeus, 1758)
Oecophora kindermanni (Herrich-Schäffer, 1854)
Oecophora superior (Rebel, 1918)
Pleurota marginella (Denis & Schiffermüller, 1775)
Pleurota aristella (Linnaeus, 1767)
Pleurota bicostella (Clerck, 1759)
Pleurota brevispinella (Zeller, 1847)
Pleurota contristatella Mann, 1867
Pleurota cumaniella Rebel, 1907
Pleurota ericella (Duponchel, 1839)
Pleurota filigerella Mann, 1867
Pleurota metricella (Zeller, 1847)
Pleurota proteella Staudinger, 1880
Pleurota pungitiella Herrich-Schäffer, 1854
Pleurota pyropella (Denis & Schiffermüller, 1775)
Schiffermuelleria schaefferella (Linnaeus, 1758)
Schiffermuelleria grandis (Desvignes, 1842)

Opostegidae
Opostega salaciella (Treitschke, 1833)
Opostega spatulella Herrich-Schäffer, 1855
Pseudopostega auritella (Hübner, 1813)
Pseudopostega crepusculella (Zeller, 1839)

Peleopodidae
Carcina quercana (Fabricius, 1775)

Plutellidae
Eidophasia messingiella (Fischer von Röslerstamm, 1840)
Eidophasia syenitella Herrich-Schäffer, 1854
Plutella xylostella (Linnaeus, 1758)
Plutella geniatella Zeller, 1839
Plutella porrectella (Linnaeus, 1758)
Rhigognostis annulatella (Curtis, 1832)
Rhigognostis hufnagelii (Zeller, 1839)
Rhigognostis incarnatella (Steudel, 1873)
Rhigognostis senilella (Zetterstedt, 1839)

Praydidae
Prays fraxinella (Bjerkander, 1784)

Prodoxidae
Lampronia aeripennella (Rebel, 1889)
Lampronia capitella (Clerck, 1759)
Lampronia corticella (Linnaeus, 1758)
Lampronia flavimitrella (Hübner, 1817)
Lampronia fuscatella (Tengstrom, 1848)
Lampronia intermediella (Heinemann, 1870)
Lampronia luzella (Hübner, 1817)
Lampronia morosa Zeller, 1852
Lampronia provectella (Heyden, 1865)
Lampronia rupella (Denis & Schiffermüller, 1775)

Psychidae
Acanthopsyche atra (Linnaeus, 1767)
Acanthopsyche ecksteini (Lederer, 1855)
Acanthopsyche siederi Szocs, 1961
Acanthopsyche zelleri (Mann, 1855)
Acentra subvestalis (Wehrli, 1933)
Acentra vestalis (Staudinger, 1871)
Anaproutia comitella (Bruand, 1853)
Anaproutia reticulatella (Bruand, 1853)
Apterona helicoidella (Vallot, 1827)
Bacotia claustrella (Bruand, 1845)
Bijugis bombycella (Denis & Schiffermüller, 1775)
Bijugis pectinella (Denis & Schiffermüller, 1775)
Canephora hirsuta (Poda, 1761)
Dahlica lichenella (Linnaeus, 1761)
Dahlica nickerlii (Heinemann, 1870)
Dahlica rakosyi Weidlich, 2005
Dahlica sauteri (Hattenschwiler, 1977)
Dahlica triquetrella (Hübner, 1813)
Dahlica wagneri (Gozmany, 1952)
Diplodoma adspersella Heinemann, 1870
Diplodoma laichartingella Goeze, 1783
Eosolenobia manni Zeller, 1852
Epichnopterix kovacsi Sieder, 1955
Epichnopterix plumella (Denis & Schiffermüller, 1775)
Eumasia parietariella (Heydenreich, 1851)
Megalophanes stetinensis (E. Hering, 1846)
Megalophanes viciella (Denis & Schiffermüller, 1775)
Narycia astrella (Herrich-Schäffer, 1851)
Narycia duplicella (Goeze, 1783)
Oiketicoides senex (Staudinger, 1871)
Pachythelia villosella (Ochsenheimer, 1810)
Postsolenobia banatica (M. Hering, 1922)
Postsolenobia nanosella Petru & Liska, 2003
Praesolenobia clathrella Fischer v. Röslerstamm, 1837
Proutia betulina (Zeller, 1839)
Pseudobankesia dioszeghyi (Rebel, 1938)
Psyche casta (Pallas, 1767)
Psyche crassiorella Bruand, 1851
Psychidea balcanica (Wehrli, 1933)
Psychidea nudella (Ochsenheimer, 1810)
Ptilocephala agrostidis (Schrank, 1802)
Ptilocephala muscella (Denis & Schiffermüller, 1775)
Ptilocephala plumifera (Ochsenheimer, 1810)
Rebelia herrichiella Strand, 1912
Rebelia kruegeri Turati, 1914
Rebelia perlucidella (Bruand, 1853)
Rebelia sapho (Milliere, 1864)
Rebelia surientella (Bruand, 1858)
Reisseronia arnscheidi Weidlich, 2006
Siederia listerella (Linnaeus, 1758)
Siederia transsilvanica Herrmann & Weidlich, 1999
Sterrhopterix fusca (Haworth, 1809)
Sterrhopterix standfussi (Wocke, 1851)
Taleporia politella (Ochsenheimer, 1816)
Taleporia tubulosa (Retzius, 1783)
Typhonia ciliaris (Ochsenheimer, 1810)

Pterolonchidae
Pterolonche albescens Zeller, 1847

Pterophoridae
Adaina microdactyla (Hübner, 1813)
Agdistis adactyla (Hübner, 1819)
Agdistis bennetii (Curtis, 1833)
Agdistis intermedia Caradja, 1920
Agdistis meridionalis (Zeller, 1847)
Agdistis satanas Milliere, 1875
Agdistis tamaricis (Zeller, 1847)
Amblyptilia acanthadactyla (Hübner, 1813)
Amblyptilia punctidactyla (Haworth, 1811)
Buszkoiana capnodactylus (Zeller, 1841)
Calyciphora albodactylus (Fabricius, 1794)
Calyciphora xanthodactyla (Treitschke, 1833)
Capperia britanniodactylus (Gregson, 1867)
Capperia celeusi (Frey, 1886)
Capperia fusca (O. Hofmann, 1898)
Capperia maratonica Adamczewski, 1951
Capperia trichodactyla (Denis & Schiffermüller, 1775)
Cnaemidophorus rhododactyla (Denis & Schiffermüller, 1775)
Crombrugghia distans (Zeller, 1847)
Crombrugghia laetus (Zeller, 1847)
Crombrugghia tristis (Zeller, 1841)
Emmelina monodactyla (Linnaeus, 1758)
Geina didactyla (Linnaeus, 1758)
Gillmeria miantodactylus (Zeller, 1841)
Gillmeria ochrodactyla (Denis & Schiffermüller, 1775)
Gillmeria pallidactyla (Haworth, 1811)
Hellinsia carphodactyla (Hübner, 1813)
Hellinsia didactylites (Strom, 1783)
Hellinsia distinctus (Herrich-Schäffer, 1855)
Hellinsia inulae (Zeller, 1852)
Hellinsia lienigianus (Zeller, 1852)
Hellinsia osteodactylus (Zeller, 1841)
Hellinsia tephradactyla (Hübner, 1813)
Marasmarcha lunaedactyla (Haworth, 1811)
Merrifieldia baliodactylus (Zeller, 1841)
Merrifieldia leucodactyla (Denis & Schiffermüller, 1775)
Merrifieldia malacodactylus (Zeller, 1847)
Merrifieldia tridactyla (Linnaeus, 1758)
Oidaematophorus constanti Ragonot, 1875
Oidaematophorus lithodactyla (Treitschke, 1833)
Oxyptilus chrysodactyla (Denis & Schiffermüller, 1775)
Oxyptilus ericetorum (Stainton, 1851)
Oxyptilus parvidactyla (Haworth, 1811)
Oxyptilus pilosellae (Zeller, 1841)
Paraplatyptilia metzneri (Zeller, 1841)
Platyptilia farfarellus Zeller, 1867
Platyptilia gonodactyla (Denis & Schiffermüller, 1775)
Platyptilia isodactylus (Zeller, 1852)
Platyptilia nemoralis Zeller, 1841
Platyptilia tesseradactyla (Linnaeus, 1761)
Porrittia galactodactyla (Denis & Schiffermüller, 1775)
Pselnophorus heterodactyla (Muller, 1764)
Pterophorus ischnodactyla (Treitschke, 1835)
Pterophorus pentadactyla (Linnaeus, 1758)
Stenoptilia bipunctidactyla (Scopoli, 1763)
Stenoptilia coprodactylus (Stainton, 1851)
Stenoptilia graphodactyla (Treitschke, 1833)
Stenoptilia pelidnodactyla (Stein, 1837)
Stenoptilia pterodactyla (Linnaeus, 1761)
Stenoptilia stigmatodactylus (Zeller, 1852)
Stenoptilia zophodactylus (Duponchel, 1840)
Wheeleria obsoletus (Zeller, 1841)
Wheeleria spilodactylus (Curtis, 1827)

Pyralidae
Achroia grisella (Fabricius, 1794)
Acrobasis advenella (Zincken, 1818)
Acrobasis centunculella (Mann, 1859)
Acrobasis consociella (Hübner, 1813)
Acrobasis dulcella (Zeller, 1848)
Acrobasis glaucella Staudinger, 1859
Acrobasis legatea (Haworth, 1811)
Acrobasis marmorea (Haworth, 1811)
Acrobasis obtusella (Hübner, 1796)
Acrobasis repandana (Fabricius, 1798)
Acrobasis sodalella Zeller, 1848
Acrobasis suavella (Zincken, 1818)
Acrobasis tumidana (Denis & Schiffermüller, 1775)
Aglossa caprealis (Hübner, 1809)
Aglossa pinguinalis (Linnaeus, 1758)
Aglossa signicostalis Staudinger, 1871
Alophia combustella (Herrich-Schäffer, 1855)
Ancylosis albicosta (Staudinger, 1870)
Ancylosis cinnamomella (Duponchel, 1836)
Ancylosis deserticola (Staudinger, 1870)
Ancylosis leucocephala (Staudinger, 1879)
Ancylosis maculifera Staudinger, 1870
Ancylosis oblitella (Zeller, 1848)
Ancylosis pallida (Staudinger, 1870)
Ancylosis pyrethrella (Herrich-Schäffer, 1860)
Ancylosis roscidella (Eversmann, 1844)
Ancylosis sareptalla (Herrich-Schäffer, 1861)
Ancylosoma substratellum (Christoph, 1877)
Anerastia lotella (Hübner, 1813)
Aphomia foedella (Zeller, 1839)
Aphomia sociella (Linnaeus, 1758)
Aphomia zelleri de Joannis, 1932
Apomyelois bistriatella (Hulst, 1887)
Apomyelois ceratoniae (Zeller, 1839)
Asalebria florella (Mann, 1862)
Asarta aethiopella (Duponchel, 1837)
Assara terebrella (Zincken, 1818)
Bradyrrhoa gilveolella (Treitschke, 1832)
Cadra calidella (Guenee, 1845)
Cadra cautella (Walker, 1863)
Cadra figulilella (Gregson, 1871)
Cadra furcatella (Herrich-Schäffer, 1849)
Catastia marginea (Denis & Schiffermüller, 1775)
Corcyra cephalonica (Stainton, 1866)
Cryptoblabes bistriga (Haworth, 1811)
Delplanqueia dilutella (Denis & Schiffermüller, 1775)
Dioryctria abietella (Denis & Schiffermüller, 1775)
Dioryctria schuetzeella Fuchs, 1899
Dioryctria simplicella Heinemann, 1863
Dioryctria sylvestrella (Ratzeburg, 1840)
Eccopisa effractella Zeller, 1848
Ectohomoeosoma kasyellum Roesler, 1965
Elegia fallax (Staudinger, 1881)
Elegia similella (Zincken, 1818)
Ematheudes punctella (Treitschke, 1833)
Endotricha flammealis (Denis & Schiffermüller, 1775)
Ephestia elutella (Hübner, 1796)
Ephestia kuehniella Zeller, 1879
Ephestia unicolorella Staudinger, 1881
Ephestia welseriella (Zeller, 1848)
Epidauria strigosa (Staudinger, 1879)
Epischidia fulvostrigella (Eversmann, 1844)
Epischnia illotella Zeller, 1839
Epischnia prodromella (Hübner, 1799)
Episcythrastis tetricella (Denis & Schiffermüller, 1775)
Etiella zinckenella (Treitschke, 1832)
Eucarphia vinetella (Fabricius, 1787)
Eurhodope cirrigerella (Zincken, 1818)
Eurhodope rosella (Scopoli, 1763)
Euzophera bigella (Zeller, 1848)
Euzophera cinerosella (Zeller, 1839)
Euzophera fuliginosella (Heinemann, 1865)
Euzophera pinguis (Haworth, 1811)
Euzopherodes charlottae (Rebel, 1914)
Euzopherodes lutisignella (Mann, 1869)
Euzopherodes vapidella (Mann, 1857)
Galleria mellonella (Linnaeus, 1758)
Glyptoteles leucacrinella Zeller, 1848
Gymnancyla canella (Denis & Schiffermüller, 1775)
Gymnancyla hornigii (Lederer, 1852)
Homoeosoma gravosellum Roesler, 1965
Homoeosoma inustella Ragonot, 1884
Homoeosoma nebulella (Denis & Schiffermüller, 1775)
Homoeosoma nimbella (Duponchel, 1837)
Homoeosoma sinuella (Fabricius, 1794)
Hypochalcia ahenella (Denis & Schiffermüller, 1775)
Hypochalcia balcanica Ragonot, 1887
Hypochalcia decorella (Hübner, 1810)
Hypochalcia dignella (Hübner, 1796)
Hypochalcia lignella (Hübner, 1796)
Hypochalcia propinquella (Guenee, 1845)
Hyporatasa allotriella (Herrich-Schäffer, 1855)
Hypotia massilialis (Duponchel, 1832)
Hypsopygia costalis (Fabricius, 1775)
Hypsopygia fulvocilialis (Duponchel, 1834)
Hypsopygia glaucinalis (Linnaeus, 1758)
Hypsopygia incarnatalis (Zeller, 1847)
Hypsopygia rubidalis (Denis & Schiffermüller, 1775)
Hypsotropa limbella Zeller, 1848
Hypsotropa unipunctella Ragonot, 1888
Insalebria serraticornella (Zeller, 1839)
Isauria dilucidella (Duponchel, 1836)
Khorassania compositella (Treitschke, 1835)
Lamoria anella (Denis & Schiffermüller, 1775)
Laodamia faecella (Zeller, 1839)
Matilella fusca (Haworth, 1811)
Megasis rippertella (Zeller, 1839)
Merulempista cingillella (Zeller, 1846)
Metallosticha argyrogrammos (Zeller, 1847)
Moitrelia obductella (Zeller, 1839)
Myelois circumvoluta (Fourcroy, 1785)
Myelois cribratella Zeller, 1847
Myelois multiflorella Ragonot, 1887
Nephopterix angustella (Hübner, 1796)
Nyctegretis lineana (Scopoli, 1786)
Nyctegretis ruminella La Harpe, 1860
Nyctegretis triangulella Ragonot, 1901
Oncocera semirubella (Scopoli, 1763)
Ortholepis betulae (Goeze, 1778)
Oxybia transversella (Duponchel, 1836)
Pempelia albariella Zeller, 1839
Pempelia amoenella (Zeller, 1848)
Pempelia johannella (Caradja, 1916)
Pempelia palumbella (Denis & Schiffermüller, 1775)
Pempeliella ornatella (Denis & Schiffermüller, 1775)
Phycita coronatella (Guenee, 1845)
Phycita meliella (Mann, 1864)
Phycita metzneri (Zeller, 1846)
Phycita poteriella (Zeller, 1846)
Phycita roborella (Denis & Schiffermüller, 1775)
Phycitodes albatella (Ragonot, 1887)
Phycitodes binaevella (Hübner, 1813)
Phycitodes inquinatella (Ragonot, 1887)
Phycitodes lacteella (Rothschild, 1915)
Phycitodes maritima (Tengstrom, 1848)
Phycitodes saxicola (Vaughan, 1870)
Pima boisduvaliella (Guenee, 1845)
Plodia interpunctella (Hübner, 1813)
Psorosa dahliella (Treitschke, 1832)
Pterothrixidia rufella (Duponchel, 1836)
Pyralis farinalis (Linnaeus, 1758)
Pyralis lienigialis (Zeller, 1843)
Pyralis perversalis (Herrich-Schäffer, 1849)
Pyralis regalis Denis & Schiffermüller, 1775
Raphimetopus ablutella (Zeller, 1839)
Rhodophaea formosa (Haworth, 1811)
Salebriopsis albicilla (Herrich-Schäffer, 1849)
Sciota adelphella (Fischer v. Röslerstamm, 1836)
Sciota fumella (Eversmann, 1844)
Sciota hostilis (Stephens, 1834)
Sciota insignella (Mann, 1862)
Sciota marmorata (Alphéraky, 1877)
Sciota rhenella (Zincken, 1818)
Selagia argyrella (Denis & Schiffermüller, 1775)
Selagia spadicella (Hübner, 1796)
Stemmatophora brunnealis (Treitschke, 1829)
Stemmatophora combustalis (Fischer v. Röslerstamm, 1842)
Stemmatophora honestalis (Treitschke, 1829)
Synaphe antennalis (Fabricius, 1794)
Synaphe bombycalis (Denis & Schiffermüller, 1775)
Synaphe moldavica (Esper, 1794)
Synaphe punctalis (Fabricius, 1775)
Tephris cyriella (Erschoff, 1874)
Trachonitis cristella (Denis & Schiffermüller, 1775)
Vitula biviella (Zeller, 1848)
Zophodia grossulariella (Hübner, 1809)

Roeslerstammiidae
Roeslerstammia erxlebella (Fabricius, 1787)
Roeslerstammia pronubella (Denis & Schiffermüller, 1775)

Saturniidae
Aglia tau (Linnaeus, 1758)
Antheraea yamamai (Guerin-Meneville, 1861)
Saturnia spini (Denis & Schiffermüller, 1775)
Saturnia caecigena Kupido, 1825
Saturnia pyri (Denis & Schiffermüller, 1775)

Schreckensteiniidae
Schreckensteinia festaliella (Hübner, 1819)

Scythrididae
Episcythris triangulella (Ragonot, 1874)
Parascythris muelleri (Mann, 1871)
Scythris amphonycella (Geyer, 1836)
Scythris apicalis (Zeller, 1847)
Scythris apicistrigella (Staudinger, 1870)
Scythris clavella (Zeller, 1855)
Scythris crassiuscula (Herrich-Schäffer, 1855)
Scythris cupreella (Staudinger, 1859)
Scythris cuspidella (Denis & Schiffermüller, 1775)
Scythris ericetella (Heinemann, 1872)
Scythris fallacella (Schlager, 1847)
Scythris flavilaterella (Fuchs, 1886)
Scythris flaviventrella (Herrich-Schäffer, 1855)
Scythris fuscoaenea (Haworth, 1828)
Scythris hungaricella Rebel, 1917
Scythris inspersella (Hübner, 1817)
Scythris laminella (Denis & Schiffermüller, 1775)
Scythris limbella (Fabricius, 1775)
Scythris moldavicella Caradja, 1905
Scythris obscurella (Scopoli, 1763)
Scythris pascuella (Zeller, 1855)
Scythris paullella (Herrich-Schäffer, 1855)
Scythris picaepennis (Haworth, 1828)
Scythris podoliensis Rebel, 1938
Scythris productella (Zeller, 1839)
Scythris pudorinella (Moschler, 1866)
Scythris punctivittella (O. Costa, 1836)
Scythris scopolella (Linnaeus, 1767)
Scythris seliniella (Zeller, 1839)
Scythris siccella (Zeller, 1839)
Scythris subaerariella (Stainton, 1867)
Scythris subseliniella (Heinemann, 1876)
Scythris tributella (Zeller, 1847)

Sesiidae
Bembecia albanensis (Rebel, 1918)
Bembecia ichneumoniformis (Denis & Schiffermüller, 1775)
Bembecia megillaeformis (Hübner, 1813)
Bembecia puella Z. Lastuvka, 1989
Bembecia uroceriformis (Treitschke, 1834)
Chamaesphecia aerifrons (Zeller, 1847)
Chamaesphecia alysoniformis (Herrich-Schäffer, 1846)
Chamaesphecia anatolica Schwingenschuss, 1938
Chamaesphecia annellata (Zeller, 1847)
Chamaesphecia astatiformis (Herrich-Schäffer, 1846)
Chamaesphecia bibioniformis (Esper, 1800)
Chamaesphecia chalciformis (Esper, 1804)
Chamaesphecia crassicornis Bartel, 1912
Chamaesphecia doleriformis (Herrich-Schäffer, 1846)
Chamaesphecia dumonti Le Cerf, 1922
Chamaesphecia empiformis (Esper, 1783)
Chamaesphecia euceraeformis (Ochsenheimer, 1816)
Chamaesphecia hungarica (Tomala, 1901)
Chamaesphecia leucopsiformis (Esper, 1800)
Chamaesphecia masariformis (Ochsenheimer, 1808)
Chamaesphecia nigrifrons (Le Cerf, 1911)
Chamaesphecia oxybeliformis (Herrich-Schäffer, 1846)
Chamaesphecia palustris Kautz, 1927
Chamaesphecia schmidtiiformis (Freyer, 1836)
Chamaesphecia tenthrediniformis (Denis & Schiffermüller, 1775)
Chamaesphecia thracica Z. Lastuvka, 1983
Paranthrene tabaniformis (Rottemburg, 1775)
Pennisetia hylaeiformis (Laspeyres, 1801)
Pyropteron affinis (Staudinger, 1856)
Pyropteron chrysidiformis (Esper, 1782)
Pyropteron cirgisa (Bartel, 1912)
Pyropteron leucomelaena (Zeller, 1847)
Pyropteron minianiformis (Freyer, 1843)
Pyropteron muscaeformis (Esper, 1783)
Pyropteron triannuliformis (Freyer, 1843)
Sesia apiformis (Clerck, 1759)
Sesia melanocephala Dalman, 1816
Synanthedon andrenaeformis (Laspeyres, 1801)
Synanthedon cephiformis (Ochsenheimer, 1808)
Synanthedon conopiformis (Esper, 1782)
Synanthedon culiciformis (Linnaeus, 1758)
Synanthedon flaviventris (Staudinger, 1883)
Synanthedon formicaeformis (Esper, 1783)
Synanthedon loranthi (Kralicek, 1966)
Synanthedon mesiaeformis (Herrich-Schäffer, 1846)
Synanthedon myopaeformis (Borkhausen, 1789)
Synanthedon scoliaeformis (Borkhausen, 1789)
Synanthedon spheciformis (Denis & Schiffermüller, 1775)
Synanthedon spuleri (Fuchs, 1908)
Synanthedon stomoxiformis (Hübner, 1790)
Synanthedon tipuliformis (Clerck, 1759)
Synanthedon vespiformis (Linnaeus, 1761)
Tinthia brosiformis (Hübner, 1813)
Tinthia myrmosaeformis (Herrich-Schäffer, 1846)

Sphingidae
Acherontia atropos (Linnaeus, 1758)
Agrius convolvuli (Linnaeus, 1758)
Daphnis nerii (Linnaeus, 1758)
Deilephila elpenor (Linnaeus, 1758)
Deilephila porcellus (Linnaeus, 1758)
Dolbina elegans A. Bang-Haas, 1912
Hemaris croatica (Esper, 1800)
Hemaris fuciformis (Linnaeus, 1758)
Hemaris tityus (Linnaeus, 1758)
Hippotion celerio (Linnaeus, 1758)
Hyles euphorbiae (Linnaeus, 1758)
Hyles gallii (Rottemburg, 1775)
Hyles hippophaes (Esper, 1789)
Hyles livornica (Esper, 1780)
Laothoe populi (Linnaeus, 1758)
Macroglossum stellatarum (Linnaeus, 1758)
Marumba quercus (Denis & Schiffermüller, 1775)
Mimas tiliae (Linnaeus, 1758)
Proserpinus proserpina (Pallas, 1772)
Smerinthus ocellata (Linnaeus, 1758)
Sphingoneopsis gorgoniades (Hübner, 1819)
Sphinx ligustri Linnaeus, 1758
Sphinx pinastri Linnaeus, 1758
Theretra alecto (Linnaeus, 1758)

Stathmopodidae
Stathmopoda pedella (Linnaeus, 1761)

Thyrididae
Thyris fenestrella (Scopoli, 1763)

Tineidae
Agnathosia mendicella (Denis & Schiffermüller, 1775)
Anomalotinea liguriella (Milliere, 1879)
Archinemapogon yildizae Kocak, 1981
Ateliotum hungaricellum Zeller, 1839
Cephimallota angusticostella (Zeller, 1839)
Ceratuncus danubiella (Mann, 1866)
Eudarcia herculanella (Capuse, 1966)
Eudarcia aureliani (Capuse, 1967)
Eudarcia confusella (Heydenreich, 1851)
Eudarcia granulatella (Zeller, 1852)
Euplocamus anthracinalis (Scopoli, 1763)
Haplotinea ditella (Pierce & Metcalfe, 1938)
Haplotinea insectella (Fabricius, 1794)
Infurcitinea albicomella (Stainton, 1851)
Infurcitinea banatica Petersen, 1961
Infurcitinea ignicomella (Zeller, 1852)
Infurcitinea olympica Petersen, 1958
Infurcitinea rumelicella (Rebel, 1903)
Ischnoscia borreonella (Milliere, 1874)
Lichenotinea pustulatella (Zeller, 1852)
Monopis crocicapitella (Clemens, 1859)
Monopis imella (Hübner, 1813)
Monopis laevigella (Denis & Schiffermüller, 1775)
Monopis monachella (Hübner, 1796)
Monopis obviella (Denis & Schiffermüller, 1775)
Monopis pallidella Zagulajev, 1955
Morophaga choragella (Denis & Schiffermüller, 1775)
Myrmecozela ochraceella (Tengstrom, 1848)
Nemapogon clematella (Fabricius, 1781)
Nemapogon cloacella (Haworth, 1828)
Nemapogon granella (Linnaeus, 1758)
Nemapogon gravosaellus Petersen, 1957
Nemapogon hungaricus Gozmany, 1960
Nemapogon inconditella (Lucas, 1956)
Nemapogon koenigi Capuse, 1967
Nemapogon nigralbella (Zeller, 1839)
Nemapogon ruricolella (Stainton, 1849)
Nemapogon variatella (Clemens, 1859)
Nemapogon wolffiella Karsholt & Nielsen, 1976
Nemaxera betulinella (Fabricius, 1787)
Neurothaumasia ankerella (Mann, 1867)
Niditinea fuscella (Linnaeus, 1758)
Niditinea striolella (Matsumura, 1931)
Psychoides verhuella Bruand, 1853
Reisserita relicinella (Herrich-Schäffer, 1853)
Scardia boletella (Fabricius, 1794)
Stenoptinea cyaneimarmorella (Milliere, 1854)
Tenaga rhenania (Petersen, 1962)
Tinea columbariella Wocke, 1877
Tinea dubiella Stainton, 1859
Tinea flavescentella Haworth, 1828
Tinea lanella Pierce & Metcalfe, 1934
Tinea murariella Staudinger, 1859
Tinea nonimella (Zagulajev, 1955)
Tinea pallescentella Stainton, 1851
Tinea pellionella Linnaeus, 1758
Tinea semifulvella Haworth, 1828
Tinea steueri Petersen, 1966
Tinea translucens Meyrick, 1917
Tinea trinotella Thunberg, 1794
Tineola bisselliella (Hummel, 1823)
Triaxomasia caprimulgella (Stainton, 1851)
Triaxomera fulvimitrella (Sodoffsky, 1830)
Triaxomera parasitella (Hübner, 1796)
Trichophaga bipartitella (Ragonot, 1892)
Trichophaga tapetzella (Linnaeus, 1758)

Tischeriidae
Coptotriche angusticollella (Duponchel, 1843)
Coptotriche gaunacella (Duponchel, 1843)
Coptotriche heinemanni (Wocke, 1871)
Coptotriche marginea (Haworth, 1828)
Tischeria decidua Wocke, 1876
Tischeria dodonaea Stainton, 1858
Tischeria ekebladella (Bjerkander, 1795)

Tortricidae
Abrepagoge treitschkeana (Treitschke, 1835)
Acleris abietana (Hübner, 1822)
Acleris aspersana (Hübner, 1817)
Acleris bergmanniana (Linnaeus, 1758)
Acleris cristana (Denis & Schiffermüller, 1775)
Acleris emargana (Fabricius, 1775)
Acleris ferrugana (Denis & Schiffermüller, 1775)
Acleris fimbriana (Thunberg, 1791)
Acleris forsskaleana (Linnaeus, 1758)
Acleris hastiana (Linnaeus, 1758)
Acleris hippophaeana (Heyden, 1865)
Acleris holmiana (Linnaeus, 1758)
Acleris kochiella (Goeze, 1783)
Acleris laterana (Fabricius, 1794)
Acleris lipsiana (Denis & Schiffermüller, 1775)
Acleris literana (Linnaeus, 1758)
Acleris logiana (Clerck, 1759)
Acleris lorquiniana (Duponchel, 1835)
Acleris notana (Donovan, 1806)
Acleris permutana (Duponchel, 1836)
Acleris quercinana (Zeller, 1849)
Acleris rhombana (Denis & Schiffermüller, 1775)
Acleris roscidana (Hübner, 1799)
Acleris rufana (Denis & Schiffermüller, 1775)
Acleris scabrana (Denis & Schiffermüller, 1775)
Acleris schalleriana (Linnaeus, 1761)
Acleris sparsana (Denis & Schiffermüller, 1775)
Acleris umbrana (Hübner, 1799)
Acleris variegana (Denis & Schiffermüller, 1775)
Adoxophyes orana (Fischer v. Röslerstamm, 1834)
Aethes beatricella (Walsingham, 1898)
Aethes bilbaensis (Rossler, 1877)
Aethes caucasica (Amsel, 1959)
Aethes cnicana (Westwood, 1854)
Aethes decimana (Denis & Schiffermüller, 1775)
Aethes dilucidana (Stephens, 1852)
Aethes fennicana (M. Hering, 1924)
Aethes flagellana (Duponchel, 1836)
Aethes francillana (Fabricius, 1794)
Aethes hartmanniana (Clerck, 1759)
Aethes kindermanniana (Treitschke, 1830)
Aethes margaritana (Haworth, 1811)
Aethes margarotana (Duponchel, 1836)
Aethes moribundana (Staudinger, 1859)
Aethes nefandana (Kennel, 1899)
Aethes rubigana (Treitschke, 1830)
Aethes rutilana (Hübner, 1817)
Aethes sanguinana (Treitschke, 1830)
Aethes smeathmanniana (Fabricius, 1781)
Aethes tesserana (Denis & Schiffermüller, 1775)
Aethes tornella (Walsingham, 1898)
Aethes triangulana (Treitschke, 1835)
Aethes williana (Brahm, 1791)
Agapeta hamana (Linnaeus, 1758)
Agapeta largana (Rebel, 1906)
Agapeta zoegana (Linnaeus, 1767)
Aleimma loeflingiana (Linnaeus, 1758)
Ancylis achatana (Denis & Schiffermüller, 1775)
Ancylis apicella (Denis & Schiffermüller, 1775)
Ancylis badiana (Denis & Schiffermüller, 1775)
Ancylis bucovinella Peiu & Nemes, 1969
Ancylis comptana (Frolich, 1828)
Ancylis diminutana (Haworth, 1811)
Ancylis geminana (Donovan, 1806)
Ancylis laetana (Fabricius, 1775)
Ancylis mitterbacheriana (Denis & Schiffermüller, 1775)
Ancylis myrtillana (Treitschke, 1830)
Ancylis obtusana (Haworth, 1811)
Ancylis paludana Barrett, 1871
Ancylis selenana (Guenee, 1845)
Ancylis subarcuana (Douglas, 1847)
Ancylis tineana (Hübner, 1799)
Ancylis uncella (Denis & Schiffermüller, 1775)
Ancylis unculana (Haworth, 1811)
Ancylis unguicella (Linnaeus, 1758)
Ancylis upupana (Treitschke, 1835)
Aphelia viburniana (Denis & Schiffermüller, 1775)
Aphelia ferugana (Hübner, 1793)
Aphelia paleana (Hübner, 1793)
Apotomis betuletana (Haworth, 1811)
Apotomis capreana (Hübner, 1817)
Apotomis inundana (Denis & Schiffermüller, 1775)
Apotomis lineana (Denis & Schiffermüller, 1775)
Apotomis lutosana (Kennel, 1901)
Apotomis sauciana (Frolich, 1828)
Apotomis semifasciana (Haworth, 1811)
Apotomis sororculana (Zetterstedt, 1839)
Apotomis turbidana Hübner, 1825
Archips crataegana (Hübner, 1799)
Archips oporana (Linnaeus, 1758)
Archips podana (Scopoli, 1763)
Archips rosana (Linnaeus, 1758)
Archips xylosteana (Linnaeus, 1758)
Argyroploce arbutella (Linnaeus, 1758)
Argyroploce concretana (Wocke, 1862)
Argyroploce externa (Eversmann, 1844)
Argyroploce lediana (Linnaeus, 1758)
Argyroploce noricana (Herrich-Schäffer, 1851)
Argyroploce roseomaculana (Herrich-Schäffer, 1851)
Argyrotaenia ljungiana (Thunberg, 1797)
Aterpia circumfluxana (Christoph, 1881)
Aterpia corticana (Denis & Schiffermüller, 1775)
Bactra furfurana (Haworth, 1811)
Bactra lacteana Caradja, 1916
Bactra lancealana (Hübner, 1799)
Bactra robustana (Christoph, 1872)
Bactra venosana (Zeller, 1847)
Barbara herrichiana Obraztsov, 1960
Cacoecimorpha pronubana (Hübner, 1799)
Capricornia boisduvaliana (Duponchel, 1836)
Capua vulgana (Frolich, 1828)
Celypha aurofasciana (Haworth, 1811)
Celypha capreolana (Herrich-Schäffer, 1851)
Celypha cespitana (Hübner, 1817)
Celypha doubledayana (Barrett, 1872)
Celypha flavipalpana (Herrich-Schäffer, 1851)
Celypha lacunana (Denis & Schiffermüller, 1775)
Celypha rivulana (Scopoli, 1763)
Celypha rufana (Scopoli, 1763)
Celypha rurestrana (Duponchel, 1843)
Celypha siderana (Treitschke, 1835)
Celypha striana (Denis & Schiffermüller, 1775)
Celypha woodiana (Barrett, 1882)
Ceratoxanthis rakosyella Wieser & Huemer, 2000
Choristoneura diversana (Hübner, 1817)
Choristoneura hebenstreitella (Muller, 1764)
Choristoneura lafauryana (Ragonot, 1875)
Choristoneura murinana (Hübner, 1799)
Clepsis balcanica (Rebel, 1917)
Clepsis consimilana (Hübner, 1817)
Clepsis neglectana (Herrich-Schäffer, 1851)
Clepsis pallidana (Fabricius, 1776)
Clepsis rogana (Guenee, 1845)
Clepsis rurinana (Linnaeus, 1758)
Clepsis senecionana (Hübner, 1819)
Clepsis spectrana (Treitschke, 1830)
Cnephasia alticolana (Herrich-Schäffer, 1851)
Cnephasia asseclana (Denis & Schiffermüller, 1775)
Cnephasia chrysantheana (Duponchel, 1843)
Cnephasia communana (Herrich-Schäffer, 1851)
Cnephasia cupressivorana (Staudinger, 1871)
Cnephasia genitalana Pierce & Metcalfe, 1922
Cnephasia graecana Rebel, 1902
Cnephasia hellenica Obraztsov, 1956
Cnephasia laetana (Staudinger, 1871)
Cnephasia orientana (Alphéraky, 1876)
Cnephasia oxyacanthana (Herrich-Schäffer, 1851)
Cnephasia pasiuana (Hübner, 1799)
Cnephasia sedana (Constant, 1884)
Cnephasia stephensiana (Doubleday, 1849)
Cnephasia abrasana (Duponchel, 1843)
Cnephasia incertana (Treitschke, 1835)
Cochylidia heydeniana (Herrich-Schäffer, 1851)
Cochylidia implicitana (Wocke, 1856)
Cochylidia moguntiana (Rossler, 1864)
Cochylidia rupicola (Curtis, 1834)
Cochylidia subroseana (Haworth, 1811)
Cochylimorpha alternana (Stephens, 1834)
Cochylimorpha cultana (Lederer, 1855)
Cochylimorpha discolorana (Kennel, 1899)
Cochylimorpha discopunctana (Eversmann, 1844)
Cochylimorpha elongana (Fischer v. Röslerstamm, 1839)
Cochylimorpha fucatana (Snellen, 1883)
Cochylimorpha fucosa (Razowski, 1970)
Cochylimorpha halophilana (Christoph, 1872)
Cochylimorpha hilarana (Herrich-Schäffer, 1851)
Cochylimorpha jucundana (Treitschke, 1835)
Cochylimorpha meridiana (Staudinger, 1859)
Cochylimorpha obliquana (Eversmann, 1844)
Cochylimorpha perfusana (Guenee, 1845)
Cochylimorpha straminea (Haworth, 1811)
Cochylimorpha subwoliniana (Danilevsky, 1962)
Cochylimorpha woliniana (Schleich, 1868)
Cochylis atricapitana (Stephens, 1852)
Cochylis defessana (Mann, 1861)
Cochylis dubitana (Hübner, 1799)
Cochylis epilinana Duponchel, 1842
Cochylis hybridella (Hübner, 1813)
Cochylis nana (Haworth, 1811)
Cochylis pallidana Zeller, 1847
Cochylis posterana Zeller, 1847
Cochylis roseana (Haworth, 1811)
Cochylis salebrana (Mann, 1862)
Commophila aeneana (Hübner, 1800)
Corticivora piniana (Herrich-Schäffer, 1851)
Crocidosema plebejana Zeller, 1847
Cryptocochylis conjunctana (Mann, 1864)
Cydia albipicta (Sauter, 1968)
Cydia amplana (Hübner, 1800)
Cydia conicolana (Heylaerts, 1874)
Cydia coniferana (Saxesen, 1840)
Cydia cosmophorana (Treitschke, 1835)
Cydia duplicana (Zetterstedt, 1839)
Cydia exquisitana (Rebel, 1889)
Cydia fagiglandana (Zeller, 1841)
Cydia honorana (Herrich-Schäffer, 1851)
Cydia ilipulana (Walsingham, 1903)
Cydia inquinatana (Hübner, 1800)
Cydia intexta (Kuznetsov, 1962)
Cydia medicaginis (Kuznetsov, 1962)
Cydia microgrammana (Guenee, 1845)
Cydia nigricana (Fabricius, 1794)
Cydia oxytropidis (Martini, 1912)
Cydia pactolana (Zeller, 1840)
Cydia pomonella (Linnaeus, 1758)
Cydia pyrivora (Danilevsky, 1947)
Cydia servillana (Duponchel, 1836)
Cydia splendana (Hübner, 1799)
Cydia strobilella (Linnaeus, 1758)
Cydia succedana (Denis & Schiffermüller, 1775)
Cymolomia hartigiana (Saxesen, 1840)
Diceratura ostrinana (Guenee, 1845)
Diceratura roseofasciana (Mann, 1855)
Dichelia histrionana (Frolich, 1828)
Dichrorampha acuminatana (Lienig & Zeller, 1846)
Dichrorampha aeratana (Pierce & Metcalfe, 1915)
Dichrorampha agilana (Tengstrom, 1848)
Dichrorampha alpinana (Treitschke, 1830)
Dichrorampha cacaleana (Herrich-Schäffer, 1851)
Dichrorampha cinerosana (Herrich-Schäffer, 1851)
Dichrorampha consortana Stephens, 1852
Dichrorampha distinctana (Heinemann, 1863)
Dichrorampha eximia (Danilevsky, 1948)
Dichrorampha flavidorsana Knaggs, 1867
Dichrorampha gruneriana (Herrich-Schäffer, 1851)
Dichrorampha heegerana (Duponchel, 1843)
Dichrorampha incursana (Herrich-Schäffer, 1851)
Dichrorampha montanana (Duponchel, 1843)
Dichrorampha petiverella (Linnaeus, 1758)
Dichrorampha plumbagana (Treitschke, 1830)
Dichrorampha plumbana (Scopoli, 1763)
Dichrorampha podoliensis (Toll, 1942)
Dichrorampha senectana Guenee, 1845
Dichrorampha sequana (Hübner, 1799)
Dichrorampha simpliciana (Haworth, 1811)
Dichrorampha sylvicolana Heinemann, 1863
Dichrorampha vancouverana McDunnough, 1935
Doloploca punctulana (Denis & Schiffermüller, 1775)
Eana derivana (de La Harpe, 1858)
Eana herzegovinae Razowski, 1959
Eana incanana (Stephens, 1852)
Eana penziana (Thunberg, 1791)
Eana argentana (Clerck, 1759)
Eana osseana (Scopoli, 1763)
Eana canescana (Guenee, 1845)
Enarmonia formosana (Scopoli, 1763)
Endothenia ericetana (Humphreys & Westwood, 1845)
Endothenia gentianaeana (Hübner, 1799)
Endothenia lapideana (Herrich-Schäffer, 1851)
Endothenia marginana (Haworth, 1811)
Endothenia nigricostana (Haworth, 1811)
Endothenia oblongana (Haworth, 1811)
Endothenia quadrimaculana (Haworth, 1811)
Endothenia sororiana (Herrich-Schäffer, 1850)
Endothenia ustulana (Haworth, 1811)
Epagoge grotiana (Fabricius, 1781)
Epibactra immundana (Eversmann, 1844)
Epiblema chretieni Obraztsov, 1952
Epiblema cirsiana (Zeller, 1843)
Epiblema cnicicolana (Zeller, 1847)
Epiblema costipunctana (Haworth, 1811)
Epiblema foenella (Linnaeus, 1758)
Epiblema gammana (Mann, 1866)
Epiblema grandaevana (Lienig & Zeller, 1846)
Epiblema graphana (Treitschke, 1835)
Epiblema hepaticana (Treitschke, 1835)
Epiblema inulivora (Meyrick, 1932)
Epiblema junctana (Herrich-Schäffer, 1856)
Epiblema mendiculana (Treitschke, 1835)
Epiblema sarmatana (Christoph, 1872)
Epiblema scutulana (Denis & Schiffermüller, 1775)
Epiblema similana (Denis & Schiffermüller, 1775)
Epiblema simploniana (Duponchel, 1835)
Epiblema sticticana (Fabricius, 1794)
Epiblema turbidana (Treitschke, 1835)
Epinotia abbreviana (Fabricius, 1794)
Epinotia bilunana (Haworth, 1811)
Epinotia brunnichana (Linnaeus, 1767)
Epinotia caprana (Fabricius, 1798)
Epinotia crenana (Hübner, 1799)
Epinotia cruciana (Linnaeus, 1761)
Epinotia demarniana (Fischer v. Röslerstamm, 1840)
Epinotia festivana (Hübner, 1799)
Epinotia fraternana (Haworth, 1811)
Epinotia gimmerthaliana (Lienig & Zeller, 1846)
Epinotia granitana (Herrich-Schäffer, 1851)
Epinotia immundana (Fischer v. Röslerstamm, 1839)
Epinotia kochiana (Herrich-Schäffer, 1851)
Epinotia maculana (Fabricius, 1775)
Epinotia mercuriana (Frolich, 1828)
Epinotia nanana (Treitschke, 1835)
Epinotia nigricana (Herrich-Schäffer, 1851)
Epinotia nisella (Clerck, 1759)
Epinotia pusillana (Peyerimhoff, 1863)
Epinotia pygmaeana (Hübner, 1799)
Epinotia ramella (Linnaeus, 1758)
Epinotia rubiginosana (Herrich-Schäffer, 1851)
Epinotia signatana (Douglas, 1845)
Epinotia solandriana (Linnaeus, 1758)
Epinotia sordidana (Hübner, 1824)
Epinotia subocellana (Donovan, 1806)
Epinotia subsequana (Haworth, 1811)
Epinotia tedella (Clerck, 1759)
Epinotia tenerana (Denis & Schiffermüller, 1775)
Epinotia tetraquetrana (Haworth, 1811)
Epinotia trigonella (Linnaeus, 1758)
Eucosma aemulana (Schlager, 1849)
Eucosma agnatana (Christoph, 1872)
Eucosma albidulana (Herrich-Schäffer, 1851)
Eucosma albuneana (Zeller, 1847)
Eucosma aspidiscana (Hübner, 1817)
Eucosma balatonana (Osthelder, 1937)
Eucosma caliacrana (Caradja, 1931)
Eucosma campoliliana (Denis & Schiffermüller, 1775)
Eucosma cana (Haworth, 1811)
Eucosma conformana (Mann, 1872)
Eucosma conterminana (Guenee, 1845)
Eucosma cumulana (Guenee, 1845)
Eucosma fervidana (Zeller, 1847)
Eucosma flavispecula Kuznetsov, 1964
Eucosma hohenwartiana (Denis & Schiffermüller, 1775)
Eucosma lacteana (Treitschke, 1835)
Eucosma metzneriana (Treitschke, 1830)
Eucosma monstratana (Rebel, 1906)
Eucosma obumbratana (Lienig & Zeller, 1846)
Eucosma parvulana (Wilkinson, 1859)
Eucosma pupillana (Clerck, 1759)
Eucosma tripoliana (Barrett, 1880)
Eucosma tundrana (Kennel, 1900)
Eucosma wimmerana (Treitschke, 1835)
Eucosmomorpha albersana (Hübner, 1813)
Eudemis porphyrana (Hübner, 1799)
Eudemis profundana (Denis & Schiffermüller, 1775)
Eugnosta lathoniana (Hübner, 1800)
Eugnosta magnificana (Rebel, 1914)
Eugnosta parreyssiana (Duponchel, 1843)
Eulia ministrana (Linnaeus, 1758)
Eupoecilia ambiguella (Hübner, 1796)
Eupoecilia angustana (Hübner, 1799)
Eupoecilia sanguisorbana (Herrich-Schäffer, 1856)
Exapate duratella Heyden, 1864
Falseuncaria degreyana (McLachlan, 1869)
Falseuncaria ruficiliana (Haworth, 1811)
Fulvoclysia nerminae Kocak, 1982
Gibberifera simplana (Fischer v. Röslerstamm, 1836)
Grapholita funebrana Treitschke, 1835
Grapholita janthinana (Duponchel, 1843)
Grapholita lobarzewskii (Nowicki, 1860)
Grapholita molesta (Busck, 1916)
Grapholita tenebrosana Duponchel, 1843
Grapholita caecana Schlager, 1847
Grapholita compositella (Fabricius, 1775)
Grapholita coronillana Lienig & Zeller, 1846
Grapholita delineana Walker, 1863
Grapholita discretana Wocke, 1861
Grapholita fissana (Frolich, 1828)
Grapholita gemmiferana Treitschke, 1835
Grapholita jungiella (Clerck, 1759)
Grapholita larseni Rebel, 1903
Grapholita lathyrana (Hübner, 1822)
Grapholita lunulana (Denis & Schiffermüller, 1775)
Grapholita nebritana Treitschke, 1830
Grapholita orobana Treitschke, 1830
Grapholita pallifrontana Lienig & Zeller, 1846
Gravitarmata margarotana (Heinemann, 1863)
Gynnidomorpha alismana (Ragonot, 1883)
Gynnidomorpha luridana (Gregson, 1870)
Gynnidomorpha minimana (Caradja, 1916)
Gynnidomorpha permixtana (Denis & Schiffermüller, 1775)
Gynnidomorpha vectisana (Humphreys & Westwood, 1845)
Gypsonoma aceriana (Duponchel, 1843)
Gypsonoma dealbana (Frolich, 1828)
Gypsonoma minutana (Hübner, 1799)
Gypsonoma nitidulana (Lienig & Zeller, 1846)
Gypsonoma obraztsovi Amsel, 1959
Gypsonoma oppressana (Treitschke, 1835)
Gypsonoma sociana (Haworth, 1811)
Hedya dimidiana (Clerck, 1759)
Hedya nubiferana (Haworth, 1811)
Hedya ochroleucana (Frolich, 1828)
Hedya pruniana (Hübner, 1799)
Hedya salicella (Linnaeus, 1758)
Hysterophora maculosana (Haworth, 1811)
Isotrias hybridana (Hübner, 1817)
Isotrias rectifasciana (Haworth, 1811)
Lathronympha strigana (Fabricius, 1775)
Lepteucosma huebneriana Kocak, 1980
Lobesia andereggiana (Herrich-Schäffer, 1851)
Lobesia artemisiana (Zeller, 1847)
Lobesia bicinctana (Duponchel, 1844)
Lobesia botrana (Denis & Schiffermüller, 1775)
Lobesia indusiana (Zeller, 1847)
Lobesia matici Stanoiu, 1974
Lobesia reliquana (Hübner, 1825)
Lobesia euphorbiana (Freyer, 1842)
Lobesia occidentis Falkovitsh, 1970
Lozotaenia forsterana (Fabricius, 1781)
Metendothenia atropunctana (Zetterstedt, 1839)
Neosphaleroptera nubilana (Hübner, 1799)
Notocelia cynosbatella (Linnaeus, 1758)
Notocelia incarnatana (Hübner, 1800)
Notocelia roborana (Denis & Schiffermüller, 1775)
Notocelia rosaecolana (Doubleday, 1850)
Notocelia tetragonana (Stephens, 1834)
Notocelia trimaculana (Haworth, 1811)
Notocelia uddmanniana (Linnaeus, 1758)
Olethreutes arcuella (Clerck, 1759)
Olindia schumacherana (Fabricius, 1787)
Oporopsamma wertheimsteini (Rebel, 1913)
Orthotaenia undulana (Denis & Schiffermüller, 1775)
Pammene agnotana Rebel, 1914
Pammene albuginana (Guenee, 1845)
Pammene amygdalana (Duponchel, 1842)
Pammene argyrana (Hübner, 1799)
Pammene aurana (Fabricius, 1775)
Pammene aurita Razowski, 1991
Pammene christophana (Moschler, 1862)
Pammene fasciana (Linnaeus, 1761)
Pammene gallicana (Guenee, 1845)
Pammene gallicolana (Lienig & Zeller, 1846)
Pammene germmana (Hübner, 1799)
Pammene giganteana (Peyerimhoff, 1863)
Pammene insulana (Guenee, 1845)
Pammene juniperana (Milliere, 1858)
Pammene luedersiana (Sorhagen, 1885)
Pammene mariana (Zerny, 1920)
Pammene obscurana (Stephens, 1834)
Pammene ochsenheimeriana (Lienig & Zeller, 1846)
Pammene regiana (Zeller, 1849)
Pammene rhediella (Clerck, 1759)
Pammene spiniana (Duponchel, 1843)
Pammene splendidulana (Guenee, 1845)
Pammene trauniana (Denis & Schiffermüller, 1775)
Pandemis cerasana (Hübner, 1786)
Pandemis chondrillana (Herrich-Schäffer, 1860)
Pandemis cinnamomeana (Treitschke, 1830)
Pandemis corylana (Fabricius, 1794)
Pandemis dumetana (Treitschke, 1835)
Pandemis heparana (Denis & Schiffermüller, 1775)
Paramesia gnomana (Clerck, 1759)
Pelatea klugiana (Freyer, 1836)
Pelochrista alexinschiana (Peiu & Nemes, 1968)
Pelochrista apheliana (Kennel, 1901)
Pelochrista arabescana (Eversmann, 1844)
Pelochrista aureliana Popescu-Gorj, 1984
Pelochrista caecimaculana (Hübner, 1799)
Pelochrista decolorana (Freyer, 1842)
Pelochrista fusculana (Zeller, 1847)
Pelochrista hepatariana (Herrich-Schäffer, 1851)
Pelochrista infidana (Hübner, 1824)
Pelochrista labyrinthicana (Christoph, 1872)
Pelochrista latericiana (Rebel, 1919)
Pelochrista modicana (Zeller, 1847)
Pelochrista mollitana (Zeller, 1847)
Periclepsis cinctana (Denis & Schiffermüller, 1775)
Phalonidia acutana (Kennel, 1913)
Phalonidia affinitana (Douglas, 1846)
Phalonidia albipalpana (Zeller, 1847)
Phalonidia contractana (Zeller, 1847)
Phalonidia curvistrigana (Stainton, 1859)
Phalonidia gilvicomana (Zeller, 1847)
Phalonidia manniana (Fischer v. Röslerstamm, 1839)
Phaneta pauperana (Duponchel, 1843)
Phiaris bipunctana (Fabricius, 1794)
Phiaris metallicana (Hübner, 1799)
Phiaris micana (Denis & Schiffermüller, 1775)
Phiaris palustrana (Lienig & Zeller, 1846)
Phiaris schulziana (Fabricius, 1776)
Phiaris scoriana (Guenee, 1845)
Phiaris septentrionana (Curtis, 1835)
Phiaris stibiana (Guenee, 1845)
Phiaris turfosana (Herrich-Schäffer, 1851)
Phiaris umbrosana (Freyer, 1842)
Philedone gerningana (Denis & Schiffermüller, 1775)
Philedonides lunana (Thunberg, 1784)
Philedonides rhombicana (Herrich-Schäffer, 1851)
Phtheochroa annae Huemer, 1990
Phtheochroa fulvicinctana (Constant, 1893)
Phtheochroa inopiana (Haworth, 1811)
Phtheochroa procerana (Lederer, 1853)
Phtheochroa pulvillana Herrich-Schäffer, 1851
Phtheochroa purana (Guenee, 1845)
Phtheochroa schreibersiana (Frolich, 1828)
Phtheochroa sodaliana (Haworth, 1811)
Phtheochroa unionana (Kennel, 1900)
Piniphila bifasciana (Haworth, 1811)
Pristerognatha fuligana (Denis & Schiffermüller, 1775)
Pristerognatha penthinana (Guenee, 1845)
Prochlidonia amiantana (Hübner, 1799)
Propiromorpha rhodophana (Herrich-Schäffer, 1851)
Pseudargyrotoza conwagana (Fabricius, 1775)
Pseudeulia asinana (Hübner, 1799)
Pseudococcyx mughiana (Zeller, 1868)
Pseudococcyx posticana (Zetterstedt, 1839)
Pseudococcyx turionella (Linnaeus, 1758)
Pseudohermenias abietana (Fabricius, 1787)
Pseudosciaphila branderiana (Linnaeus, 1758)
Ptycholoma lecheana (Linnaeus, 1758)
Ptycholomoides aeriferana (Herrich-Schäffer, 1851)
Retinia perangustana (Snellen, 1883)
Retinia resinella (Linnaeus, 1758)
Rhopobota naevana (Hübner, 1817)
Rhopobota stagnana (Denis & Schiffermüller, 1775)
Rhopobota ustomaculana (Curtis, 1831)
Rhyacionia buoliana (Denis & Schiffermüller, 1775)
Rhyacionia pinicolana (Doubleday, 1849)
Rhyacionia pinivorana (Lienig & Zeller, 1846)
Selania leplastriana (Curtis, 1831)
Selenodes karelica (Tengstrom, 1875)
Sparganothis pilleriana (Denis & Schiffermüller, 1775)
Spatalistis bifasciana (Hübner, 1787)
Spilonota laricana (Heinemann, 1863)
Spilonota ocellana (Denis & Schiffermüller, 1775)
Stictea mygindiana (Denis & Schiffermüller, 1775)
Strophedra nitidana (Fabricius, 1794)
Strophedra weirana (Douglas, 1850)
Syndemis musculana (Hübner, 1799)
Thiodia caradjana Kennel, 1916
Thiodia citrana (Hübner, 1799)
Thiodia lerneana (Treitschke, 1835)
Thiodia major (Rebel, 1903)
Thiodia torridana (Lederer, 1859)
Thiodia trochilana (Frolich, 1828)
Thiodia tscheliana (Caradja, 1927)
Tortricodes alternella (Denis & Schiffermüller, 1775)
Tortrix viridana Linnaeus, 1758
Tosirips magyarus Razowski, 1987
Xerocnephasia rigana (Sodoffsky, 1829)
Zeiraphera griseana (Hübner, 1799)
Zeiraphera isertana (Fabricius, 1794)
Zeiraphera ratzeburgiana (Saxesen, 1840)
Zeiraphera rufimitrana (Herrich-Schäffer, 1851)

Urodidae
Wockia asperipunctella (Bruand, 1851)

Yponomeutidae
Cedestis gysseleniella Zeller, 1839
Cedestis subfasciella (Stephens, 1834)
Euhyponomeuta stannella (Thunberg, 1788)
Euhyponomeutoides albithoracellus Gaj, 1954
Kessleria alpicella (Stainton, 1851)
Niphonympha dealbatella (Zeller, 1847)
Ocnerostoma piniariella Zeller, 1847
Paraswammerdamia albicapitella (Scharfenberg, 1805)
Paraswammerdamia nebulella (Goeze, 1783)
Pseudoswammerdamia combinella (Hübner, 1786)
Scythropia crataegella (Linnaeus, 1767)
Swammerdamia caesiella (Hübner, 1796)
Swammerdamia compunctella Herrich-Schäffer, 1855
Swammerdamia pyrella (Villers, 1789)
Yponomeuta cagnagella (Hübner, 1813)
Yponomeuta evonymella (Linnaeus, 1758)
Yponomeuta irrorella (Hübner, 1796)
Yponomeuta malinellus Zeller, 1838
Yponomeuta padella (Linnaeus, 1758)
Yponomeuta plumbella (Denis & Schiffermüller, 1775)
Yponomeuta rorrella (Hübner, 1796)
Yponomeuta sedella Treitschke, 1832
Zelleria hepariella Stainton, 1849

Ypsolophidae
Ochsenheimeria taurella (Denis & Schiffermüller, 1775)
Ochsenheimeria urella Fischer von Röslerstamm, 1842
Ochsenheimeria vacculella Fischer von Röslerstamm, 1842
Ypsolopha alpella (Denis & Schiffermüller, 1775)
Ypsolopha asperella (Linnaeus, 1761)
Ypsolopha chazariella (Mann, 1866)
Ypsolopha dentella (Fabricius, 1775)
Ypsolopha falcella (Denis & Schiffermüller, 1775)
Ypsolopha horridella (Treitschke, 1835)
Ypsolopha instabilella (Mann, 1866)
Ypsolopha leuconotella (Snellen, 1884)
Ypsolopha lucella (Fabricius, 1775)
Ypsolopha mucronella (Scopoli, 1763)
Ypsolopha nemorella (Linnaeus, 1758)
Ypsolopha parenthesella (Linnaeus, 1761)
Ypsolopha persicella (Fabricius, 1787)
Ypsolopha scabrella (Linnaeus, 1761)
Ypsolopha sequella (Clerck, 1759)
Ypsolopha sylvella (Linnaeus, 1767)
Ypsolopha ustella (Clerck, 1759)
Ypsolopha vittella (Linnaeus, 1758)

Zygaenidae
Adscita geryon (Hübner, 1813)
Adscita statices (Linnaeus, 1758)
Adscita mannii (Lederer, 1853)
Jordanita chloros (Hübner, 1813)
Jordanita globulariae (Hübner, 1793)
Jordanita graeca (Jordan, 1907)
Jordanita tenuicornis (Zeller, 1847)
Jordanita subsolana (Staudinger, 1862)
Jordanita budensis (Ad. & Au. Speyer, 1858)
Jordanita notata (Zeller, 1847)
Rhagades pruni (Denis & Schiffermüller, 1775)
Theresimima ampellophaga (Bayle-Barelle, 1808)
Zygaena carniolica (Scopoli, 1763)
Zygaena laeta (Hübner, 1790)
Zygaena minos (Denis & Schiffermüller, 1775)
Zygaena punctum Ochsenheimer, 1808
Zygaena angelicae Ochsenheimer, 1808
Zygaena ephialtes (Linnaeus, 1767)
Zygaena exulans (Hohenwarth, 1792)
Zygaena filipendulae (Linnaeus, 1758)
Zygaena lonicerae (Scheven, 1777)
Zygaena loti (Denis & Schiffermüller, 1775)
Zygaena nevadensis Rambur, 1858
Zygaena osterodensis Reiss, 1921
Zygaena viciae (Denis & Schiffermüller, 1775)

References

External links
Fauna Europaea

Romania
Romania
 Romania
Lepidoptera